= Kihon Keikaku Rosen =

Bullet train rail route plan in Japan

A map of Shinkansen routes in Japan. Kihon Keikaku Rosen are shown in red.

Kihon Keikaku Rosen (基本計画路線; "Basic Plan Routes") of the Shinkansen refer to route plans for which a basic plan has been officially announced, but which have not progressed to subsequent stages such as development planning or construction.

The Shinkansen, a high-speed rail system of Japan, is planned and constructed based on the Basic Plan for Shinkansen Railway Lines to Be Constructed (建設を開始すべき新幹線鉄道の路線を定める基本計画), which is determined and publicly announced by the Minister of Land, Infrastructure, Transport and Tourism (formerly the Minister of Transport) in accordance with Article 4 (Basic Plan) of the Nationwide Shinkansen Railway Development Act (全国新幹線鉄道整備法, Zenkoku Shinkansen Tetsudō Seibihō) (Act No. 71 of 1970).

After the basic plan is decided, surveys are conducted (Article 5), followed by the formulation of a development plan (Article 7), and then the commencement of construction (Article 8). A route at the stage where the basic plan has been decided is referred to as a Kihon Keikaku Rosen, while a route that has progressed to the stage where a development plan has been determined is called a Seibi Shinkansen (整備新幹線; "Development Shinkansen").

As described below, four rounds of official designations have been made to date. Of these, the routes specified in the first through third designations have either fully or partially opened, or construction has commenced. (The only exception is the Narita Shinkansen, which was canceled in its entirety.) In contrast, of the eleven routes presented in the fourth announcement in November 1973, ten routes—excluding the maglev Chūō Shinkansen—remain at the basic plan stage as of 2026, with no construction having commenced. These ten routes, together with the Sapporo — Asahikawa section of the Hokkaidō Shinkansen (which also remains at the basic plan stage), are collectively referred to as the Kihon Keikaku Rosen.

These Kihon Keikaku Rosen remain at the conceptual stage and have not yet entered construction. Although these basic plans were formulated in 1973, they have effectively remained stalled ever since, with no advancement to date.

Nevertheless, they are considered candidate routes for future development once the Shinkansen lines currently under construction (the Seibi Shinkansen and the Chūō Shinkansen) are completed and opened. For this reason, depending on the route, promotional activities are being carried out by local governments (prefectures and municipalities) and regional business communities, such as those for the Shikoku Shinkansen and the Higashi Kyūshū Shinkansen. On the other hand, there are also routes where such movements are hardly seen.

== Designations ==
=== Designation No. 17 of 1971 ===
January 18, 1971 – Ministry of Transport Notification No. 17 (Amended: July 3, 1972 – Ministry of Transport Notification No. 242)

Line name	Japanese	Starting point	Terminal	Major intermediate locations	Current status	Plan changes
Tōhoku Shinkansen	東北新幹線	Tokyo	Aomori	Near Utsunomiya, near Sendai, Morioka	Fully open	Terminal changed from Morioka to Aomori.
Jōetsu Shinkansen	上越新幹線	Tokyo	Niigata		Fully open (Note: However, under the original plan, the Tokyo-side terminus was to be Shinjuku Station, and the Ōmiya — Shinjuku section remains as an unbuilt segment. At present, services on the Ōmiya — Tokyo section run over the Tōhoku Shinkansen.)	
Narita Shinkansen	成田新幹線	Tokyo	Narita		Canceled	The basic plan lost its legal validity and was abolished.

=== Designation No. 243 of 1972 ===
July 3, 1972 – Ministry of Transport Notification No. 243 (Amended: November 15, 1973 – Ministry of Transport Notification No. 465)

The four routes designated in 1972 are referred to as the Seibi Shinkansen (整備新幹線; "Development Shinkansen").

Line name	Japanese	Starting point	Terminal	Major intermediate locations	Current status	Plan changes
Hokkaidō Shinkansen	北海道新幹線	Aomori	Asahikawa	Near Hakodate, Sapporo	Partially open; partly under construction; partly unbuilt (Note: The Shin-Aomori — Shin-Hakodate-Hokuto section opened; the Shin-Hakodate-Hokuto — Sapporo section under construction; the Sapporo — Asahikawa section unbuilt.)	Terminal changed from Sapporo to Asahikawa.
Hokuriku Shinkansen	北陸新幹線	Tokyo	Osaka	Near Nagano, near Toyama	Partially open; partly unbuilt (Note: The Tokyo — Ōmiya section run over the Tōhoku Shinkansen; the Ōmiya — Takasaki section run over the Jōetsu Shinkansen; the Takasaki — Tsuruga section opened; the Tsuruga — Shin-Osaka section unbuilt.)	
Kyūshū Shinkansen (Kagoshima Route)	九州新幹線 (鹿児島ルート)	Fukuoka	Kagoshima		Fully open	

=== Designation No. 466 of 1972 ===
December 12, 1972 – Ministry of Transport Notification No. 466

Line name	Japanese	Starting point	Terminal	Major intermediate locations	Current status
Nishi Kyūshū Shinkansen (Kyūshū Shinkansen West Kyūshū Route)	西九州新幹線 (九州新幹線西九州ルート)	Fukuoka	Nagasaki	Saga	Partly open; partly unbuilt (Note: The Hakata — Shin-Tosu section run over the Kyūshū Shinkansen (Kagoshima Route); the Shin-Tosu — Takeo-Onsen section unbuilt; the Takeo-Onsen — Nagasaki section opened.)

=== Designation No. 466 of 1973 ===
November 15, 1973 – Ministry of Transport Notification No. 466

The following routes, excluding the Chūō Shinkansen and including the Sapporo — Asahikawa section of the Hokkaidō Shinkansen, are referred to as the Kihon Keikaku Rosen (基本計画路線; "Basic Plan Routes").

Line name	Japanese	Starting point	Terminal	Major intermediate locations	Current status
Hokkaidō Minami-mawari Shinkansen	北海道南回り新幹線	Oshamanbe	Sapporo	Near Muroran	
Uetsu Shinkansen	羽越新幹線	Toyama	Aomori	Near Niigata, near Akita	
Ōu Shinkansen	奥羽新幹線	Fukushima	Akita	Near Yamagata	
Chūō Shinkansen	中央新幹線	Tokyo	Osaka	Near Kōfu, near Nagoya, near Nara	Partly under construction; partly unbuilt (Note: The Shinagawa — Nagoya section under construction; the Nagoya — Shin-Osaka section unbuilt.)
Hokuriku–Chūkyō Shinkansen	北陸・中京新幹線	Tsuruga	Nagoya		
Sanin Shinkansen	山陰新幹線	Osaka	Shimonoseki	Near Tottori, near Matsue	
Chūgoku Ōdan Shinkansen	中国横断新幹線	Okayama	Matsue		
Shikoku Shinkansen	四国新幹線	Osaka	Ōita	Near Tokushima, near Takamatsu, near Matsuyama	
Shikoku Ōdan Shinkansen	四国横断新幹線	Okayama	Kōchi		
Higashi Kyūshū Shinkansen	東九州新幹線	Fukuoka	Kagoshima	Near Ōita, near Miyazaki	
Kyūshū Ōdan Shinkansen	九州横断新幹線	Ōita	Kumamoto		

== Developments ==
The lines for which basic plans were announced in 1971 have all been fully opened, with the exception of the Narita Shinkansen, whose plan was canceled.

The lines for which basic plans were announced in 1972 had their construction plans approved in 1973. These lines are referred to as the Seibi Shinkansen (整備新幹線; "Development Shinkansen"). Many sections have already opened or begun construction, although some sections remain unstarted.

The routes for which basic plans were announced in 1973 have traditionally been referred to as Kihon Keikaku Rosen (基本計画路線; "Basic Plan Routes"). However, in 2011, a development plan for the maglev Chūō Shinkansen— to be constructed independently by JR Central—was approved, and as a result, the Chūō Shinkansen is no longer classified as a Kihon Keikaku Rosen. As for the remaining routes, all of them remain unstarted as of 2026.

These basic plans were established in 1973 during Japanese economic miracle. However, following the 1973 oil crisis, policies to restrain total demand were implemented, and the construction of Seibi Shinkansen lines that had been scheduled to proceed first was frozen. Combined with the end of Japan's high-growth era, all of these plans were effectively suspended. Since then, up to the present day, there has been no progress on these plans (except for the Chūō Shinkansen).

Since fiscal year 2017, the MLIT has conducted annual studies titled Study on the Future Development of Trunk Railway Networks and Related Issues (幹線鉄道ネットワーク等のあり方に関する調査について), examining methods for developing the nation's trunk railway network. Topics covered in relation to the Kihon Keikaku Rosen include the construction cost and transport capacity of single-track Shinkansen systems, the construction period and cost of upgrading the Great Seto Bridge to accommodate double-track Shinkansen operations, and flow analyses of already-opened Shinkansen sections that could serve as components in new cost–benefit (B/C) evaluation methodologies.

In the White Paper on Transport Policy (交通政策白書), this research is described as "undertaking verification of the social and economic effects of Shinkansen development, as well as studies on effective and efficient methods for Shinkansen construction and operation". The White Paper on Transport Policy is an annual report published by the MLIT and submitted to the National Diet, in accordance with Article 14, paragraphs 1 and 2 of the Basic Act on Transport Policy (交通政策基本法) (Act No. 92 of 2013), with the aim of informing the public about trends in transportation and government policies related to transportation.

On June 16, 2023, following a recommendation by the Council on Economic and Fiscal Policy, the Second Kishida Cabinet (First Reshuffled) approved the policy commonly known as the "Basic Policy 2023" at a Cabinet meeting. The document states that "studies and examinations will be conducted on future directions tailored to regional circumstances regarding the enhancement of Kihon Keikaku Rosen and trunk railway networks", marking the first time that studies related to Kihon Keikaku Rosen were included in this policy framework. In addition, the Kishida Cabinet proceeded with revisions to the National Spatial Strategy under the National Spatial Planning Act (国土形成計画法), and on July 28 approved the Third National Spatial Strategy (National Plan) at a Cabinet meeting, incorporating the same wording regarding studies on Kihon Keikaku Rosen.

In January 2026, led by the Governor of Ōita Prefecture as the principal organizer, promotion groups for six lines—the Uetsu, Ōu, Sanin, Chūgoku Ōdan, Shikoku, and Higashi Kyūshū Shinkansen—gathered together for the first time and held a "grand rally" (総決起大会) calling for the advancement of the development plans for each line.

== Conditions for commencement of construction ==
Suppose that a Kihon Keikaku Rosen route were to advance one stage beyond the basic plan phase and be upgraded to a status equivalent to that of the current Seibi Shinkansen lines.

In that case, if the same scheme as the current Seibi Shinkansen were applied, the following five conditions would need to be satisfied before actual construction could begin:

- Securing a stable outlook for financial resources
- Financial viability
- Cost–benefit performance
- Consent of the JR company as the operating entity
- Consent of the affected local governments regarding the separation of heikō zairaisen (parallel conventional lines)

Kihon Keikaku Rosen, by their nature, often pass through areas with relatively small populations along the corridor. Moreover, Japan is currently facing a declining birthrate and aging population, with depopulation progressing particularly in rural regions, making future growth in ridership unlikely. Combined with the recent sharp rise in construction costs, the hurdle for meeting the requirements of financial viability and cost–benefit performance is becoming higher year by year.

In addition, under the Seibi Shinkansen scheme, a portion of the construction cost is to be borne by local governments along the route. However, this cost allocation is not based on the degree of benefit received by each prefecture, but rather on a strictly territorial basis. In other words, even if a given prefecture has limited need for the line, it is still required to bear (a portion of) the construction cost for the section passing through its territory. As a result, such prefectures tend to be reluctant toward those route options (e.g., Shiga Prefecture in the Maibara Route proposal for the Hokuriku Shinkansen).

Furthermore, under the Seibi Shinkansen scheme, the separation of heikō zairaisen—whereby they are transferred to third-sector railway companies funded by local governments—is permitted. This creates the possibility that a prefecture may be required not only to bear the construction costs of a Shinkansen line it does not need, but also to assume responsibility for loss-making conventional lines (e.g., Saga Prefecture in the case of the Nishi Kyūshū Shinkansen). As a result, the condition of obtaining the consent of all affected local governments has become a particularly high hurdle for many route proposals.

In addition, since the division and privatization of Japanese National Railways, each JR company has continued to operate as a completely separate corporation, and their interests do not necessarily align. As a result, for example, if a route proposal involves through-running onto another Shinkansen line operated by a different JR company partway along the route, obtaining the consent of the JR company designated as the operating entity can become difficult, since the revenue from that section would effectively accrue to the other company.

== Hokkaidō Shinkansen extension to Asahikawa ==
The Hokkaidō Shinkansen (北海道新幹線) was originally planned as a route between Aomori (Aomori) to Sapporo (Hokkaidō), but was later revised to extend from Aomori to Asahikawa (Hokkaidō). In practice, however, construction has only been undertaken for the Aomori — Sapporo section, while the Sapporo — Asahikawa section remains at the conceptual stage. The Aomori — Sapporo segment of the Hokkaidō Shinkansen is not a Kihon Keikaku Rosen but a Seibi Shinkansen. Meanwhile, although the Sapporo — Asahikawa section was not included among the eleven routes designated in the November 1973 announcement, it remains at the basic plan stage and is therefore discussed as one of the Kihon Keikaku Rosen.

On March 29, 2021, in anticipation of the future extension to Sapporo Station, a total of 50 organizations—including municipalities and chambers of commerce in the Kamikawa Subprefecture of Hokkaidō—established the Hokkaidō Shinkansen Asahikawa Extension Promotion Association (北海道新幹線旭川延伸促進期成会, Hokkaidō Shinkansen Asahikawa Enshin Sokushin Kiseikai). According to the association's estimates, the current travel time of 1 hour and 25 minutes between Sapporo — Asahikawa could be reduced to 29 minutes with a Shinkansen operating at a maximum speed of 360 km/h, or 35 minutes at 260 km/h.

JR Hokkaidō has not shown any particular movement toward extending the Shinkansen to Asahikawa. On the other hand, in its medium-term management plan through 2026, the company has set a goal of increasing the speed of the conventional Hakodate Main Line between Sapporo — Asahikawa, aiming to reduce the current travel time of 1 hour and 25 minutes to as little as 60 minutes.

== Hokkaidō Minami-mawari Shinkansen ==
Route of the Hokkaidō Minami-mawari Shinkansen (shown as a pink dashed line).

The Hokkaidō Minami-mawari Shinkansen (北海道南回り新幹線; "Hokkaidō Southern Route Shinkansen") is a Kihon Keikaku Rosen of Shinkansen in Hokkaidō, running from Oshamanbe, via the vicinity of Muroran, to Sapporo. It is a separate Shinkansen line from the Hokkaidō Shinkansen, parts of which have already opened.

Since the announcement of the basic plan, there have been no concrete developments toward the start of construction. Moreover, there has been little to no movement from local governments along the route to push for an early start of construction.

As its name suggests, this section was originally proposed as the Southern Route of the Hokkaidō Shinkansen. In the process of selecting the route for the line, three alternatives were considered for the section between Oshamanbe — Sapporo:

- Northern Route (北回りルート, Kita-mawari Rūto): A route passing through the Shiribeshi Subprefecture, including Kutchan and Otaru. This option would result in a shorter distance than the Southern Route.
- Central Route (中央ルート, Chūō Rūto): A route running directly from Oshamanbe to Sapporo through mountainous terrain via long tunnels. This would be the shortest option, but significant technical challenges were anticipated due to tunneling through volcanic zones.
- Southern Route (南回りルート, Minami-mawari Rūto): A route passing along the Pacific coast through the Iburi Subprefecture, including Muroran and Tomakomai. Although more circuitous, it would serve the largest population and was expected to generate demand at intermediate stations.

In the end, the Northern Route was selected, and construction proceeded accordingly. However, the Southern Route was separately designated as a Kihon Keikaku Rosen. However, the plan was effectively frozen, and no further surveys or steps toward construction have been carried out since.

== Uetsu Shinkansen ==
Route of the Uetsu Shinkansen (shown as a pink dashed line).

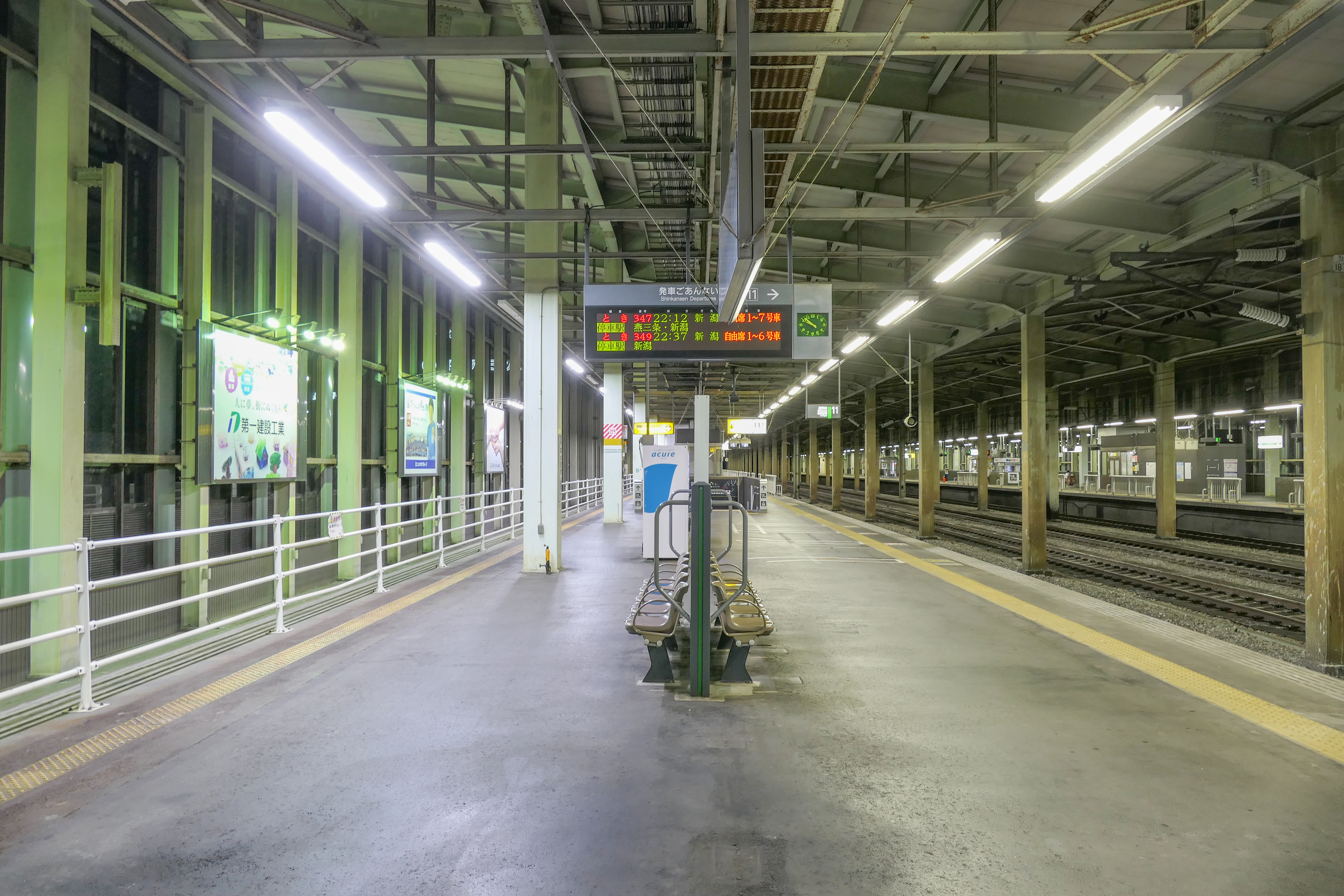
Platform 11 at Nagaoka Station (Jōetsu Shinkansen). Space has been reserved (on left) for the future construction of the Uetsu Shinkansen.

The Uetsu Shinkansen (羽越新幹線) is a Kihon Keikaku Rosen of Shinkansen, running from Toyama (Toyama), via the vicinity of Niigata (Niigata) and Akita (Akita), to Aomori (Aomori).

In Yamagata and Akita Prefectures there have been some efforts to promote development of the line. However, they are also engaged in promotional activities for the Ōu Shinkansen, described later. In Niigata Prefecture as well, there are movements supporting development, but discussions there tend to focus more on alternatives such as Mini-Shinkansen or upgrading existing conventional lines, rather than full-specification Shinkansen construction.

The section between Toyama — Jōetsumyōkō would overlap with the Hokuriku Shinkansen, while the section between Nagaoka — Niigata would overlap with the Jōetsu Shinkansen. If realized, the line—together with the Hokuriku, Jōetsu, and Hokkaidō Shinkansen—would form part of a continuous Shinkansen corridor along the Sea of Japan coast, linking Osaka, Niigata, Aomori, and Sapporo (Hokkaidō). This would enable travel between western and northern Japan without passing through the Kantō region.

It would also provide the shortest route to Tokyo from the Shōnai region (such as Tsuruoka and Sakata) of Yamagata Prefecture and from Murakami in northern Niigata Prefecture.

At Nagaoka Station, the current Jōetsu Shinkansen platforms consist of two side platforms serving two tracks (Tracks 11 and 12). Structurally, however, space has been reserved opposite Track 11 for the installation of an additional track and overhead wiring. Similarly, by expanding the station building, space could also be created on the opposite side of Track 12 to accommodate additional tracks and overhead wiring. This design reflects an original intention to allow for conversion to two island platforms with four tracks, thereby accommodating the Uetsu Shinkansen.

=== List of stations ===
Although there is not a formally approved plan, a study report by Yamagata Prefecture assumes the installation of the following stations. Stations in bold are expected to be served by all trains (the concept envisions at least one such station in each prefecture). As noted earlier, the section between Niigata — Nagaoka would be shared with the Jōetsu Shinkansen, while the section between Jōetsumyōkō — Toyama would be shared with the Hokuriku Shinkansen.

Shin-Aomori — Hirosaki — Ōdate — Takanosu — Higashi-Noshiro — Akita — Ugo-Honjō — Sakata — Tsuruoka — Murakami — Shibata — Niigata — Tsubame-Sanjō — Nagaoka — Kashiwazaki — Jōetsumyōkō — Itoigawa — Kurobe-Unazukionsen — Toyama

=== Moves toward developing a full-standard Shinkansen ===
With steady progress being made in the construction and opening of the five Seibi Shinkansen lines at the time, Yamagata Prefecture has moved to further accelerate efforts toward realizing the Ōu and Uetsu Shinkansen. On May 22, 2016, it established the Yamagata Prefecture Alliance for the Realization of the Ōu and Uetsu Shinkansen (山形県奥羽・羽越新幹線整備実現同盟, Yamagata-Ken Ōu-Uetsu Shinkansen Seibi Jitsugen Dōmei), comprising the prefectural government, national Diet members related to the prefecture, the prefectural assembly, municipalities, municipal assemblies, and the business community.

On November 3 of the same year, the Shōnai Regional Promotion Alliance, which had been centered around Tsuruoka, was reorganized into the Yamagata Prefecture Shōnai Area Alliance for the Realization of the Uetsu Shinkansen (山形県庄内地区羽越新幹線整備実現同盟会, Yamagata-Ken Shōnai Chiku Uetsu Shinkansen Seibi Jitsugen Dōmeikai).

On August 9, 2017, aiming to develop both the Ōu and Uetsu Shinkansen as full-standard Shinkansen lines, the Joint Project Team of Six Prefectures for the Uetsu and Ōu Shinkansen (羽越・奥羽新幹線関係6県合同プロジェクトチーム, Uetsu-Ōu Shinkansen Kankei Rokken Gōdō Purojekuto Chīmu) was established, with Yamagata Prefecture serving as the secretariat. The team consists of senior officials from six prefectures along the proposed routes—Aomori, Akita, Yamagata, Fukushima, Niigata, and Toyama—and held its first meeting in Yamagata. The project team conducted studies and evaluations in three areas: regional vision for the corridor, cost-effectiveness, and development methods. The survey results were reported in June 2021, and it was stated that proposals and requests to the national government would be made on an ongoing basis as needed.

=== Effects ===
The Yamagata Prefecture Alliance for the Realization of the Ōu and Uetsu Shinkansen estimates that, with the opening of the Uetsu Shinkansen (full-standard), travel time between Tokyo — Sakata would be reduced from 3 hours 55 minutes (when transferring between the Jōetsu Shinkansen and conventional lines at Niigata) to approximately 2 hours 40 minutes.

The Akita Prefecture Alliance for the Promotion of the Ōu and Uetsu Shinkansen (秋田県奥羽・羽越新幹線整備促進期成同盟会, Akita-Ken Ōu-Uetsu Shinkansen Seibi Sokushin Kisei Dōmeikai) estimates that, with the opening of the Uetsu Shinkansen (full-standard), travel time between Tokyo — Akita would be reduced from approximately 5 hours 50 minutes (via transfer at Niigata Station) to about 3 hours. For reference, using the Akita Shinkansen currently takes a minimum of 3 hours 37 minutes between Tokyo — Akita.

According to the Survey Report on Cost-Benefit Analysis for the Early Realization of the Uetsu and Ōu Shinkansen (羽越・奥羽新幹線の早期実現に向けた 費用対効果算出等業務 調査報告書), compiled in March 2020 by the Joint Project Team of Six Prefectures for the Uetsu and Ōu Shinkansen, the following travel time reductions are estimated:

- Toyama — Shin-Aomori: from 4 hours 28 minutes to 3 hours 2 minutes (a reduction of 86 minutes)
- Toyama — Niigata: from 2 hours 25 minutes to 1 hour 13 minutes (a reduction of 72 minutes)
- Niigata — Akita: from 3 hours 30 minutes to 1 hour 1 minute (a reduction of 149 minutes)

Furthermore, according to an announcement by the Joint Project Team on June 21, 2021, estimated travel times would be 2 hours 21 minutes between Tokyo — Tsuruoka, and 46 minutes between Akita — Shin-Aomori.

=== Moves toward upgrading the Shinetsu Main Line ===
In Niigata Prefecture, travel by rail between the central area (such as Niigata and Nagaoka) and the western Jōetsu region has long been inconvenient. The former is connected to the Tokyo by the Jōetsu Shinkansen, while the latter is connected to Tokyo by the Hokuriku Shinkansen. However, travel between these two areas relies on conventional lines—the Shinetsu Main Line and the Echigo Tokimeki Railway (which was separated from JR operations)—resulting in low convenience.

Due to these circumstances, there have been efforts to improve transportation by upgrading the conventional line for higher speeds or converting it into a Mini-Shinkansen. (Note: The "Mini-Shinkansen" concept refers to a method in which, instead of constructing entirely new Shinkansen tracks, existing conventional railway lines are converted to standard gauge and modified so that trains can run through directly onto Shinkansen lines. Examples that were later actually implemented include the Akita Shinkansen and the Yamagata Shinkansen.) Kashiwazaki, located along this route, has been particularly proactive, and the initiative has been incorporated into Niigata Prefecture's long-term comprehensive plan.

In fiscal 2003, Niigata Prefecture conducted a study on upgrading the Shinetsu Main Line. This was followed by studies on a Free Gauge Train (FGT) (Note: Free Gauge Train is a type of rolling stock capable of operating on tracks of different gauges. In Japan (JR context), this refers to trains that can run on both the standard-gauge Shinkansen network and the narrow-gauge conventional railway network. Globally, variable gauge technology has been put into practical use in countries such as Spain (Talgo), where trains can operate on both broad gauge and standard gauge. In Japan, however, the concept faced numerous technical and financial challenges, and development was effectively abandoned in 2018.) (Note: Because the Shinkansen and conventional railways use different track gauges, if direct through-service is desired, the options are either to operate a Free Gauge Train or to regauge the conventional line so that Mini-Shinkansen services can run on it.) in FY2006, a Mini-Shinkansen in FY2007, and in FY2008, demand forecasting and evaluation of development effects for through-operation between Shinkansen and conventional lines, along with an overall summary. After a period without further studies, discussions resumed again from FY2023.

As of March 2024, Niigata Prefecture is studying and examining the following four proposals:

- Mini-Shinkansen conversion between Jōetsumyōkō — Nagaoka:

This plan involves regauging the section between Jōetsumyōkō — Nagaoka (Echigo Tokimeki Railway Myōkō Haneuma Line and JR Shinetsu Main Line), converting one track of the double-track (from conventional narrow gauge to Shinkansen's standard gauge), and partially introducing dual gauge. A mini-Shinkansen would operate on this section and provide through services to both the Hokuriku Shinkansen and the Jōetsu Shinkansen.

- Mini-Shinkansen conversion between Itoigawa — Nagaoka:

Similar to the above plan, but instead of Jōetsumyōkō, the Mini-Shinkansen would run between Itoigawa — Nagaoka (Echigo Tokimeki Railway Nihonkai Hisui Line and JR Shinetsu Main Line). While this option requires a longer regauged section and therefore higher costs, it has the advantage of enabling through operation without the need to reverse direction toward the western Hokuriku region.

- Shinetsu Main Line upgrade plan:

This proposal would upgrade the existing Shinetsu Main Line between Jōetsumyōkō — Nagaoka by realigning certain sections, including tunnels, to create a more linear route. Limited express trains on conventional tracks would then operate on this improved alignment. Under this proposal, through services (Mini-Shinkansen) would not be operated.

- Hokuetsu Express Mini-Shinkansen conversion:

This plan would convert the Hokuetsu Express Hokuhoku Line to dual gauge, construct new connecting shortcut lines linking Jōetsumyōkō — Hokuhoku Line and Hokuhoku Line — Muikamachi, and regauge one track of the JR Jōetsu Line between Muikamachi — Urasa. A Mini-Shinkansen would operate via Jōetsumyōkō — Muikamachi — Urasa, providing through service to both the Hokuriku and Jōetsu Shinkansen lines. The Hokuhoku Line, being relatively newly built with very straight alignments, is well suited for high-speed operation. However, the need to construct new connecting lines increases costs. In addition, since this plan does not pass through Kashiwazaki, a separate conventional limited express service would need to be operated between Nagaoka — Kashiwazaki on the Shinetsu Main Line.

In addition, at Niigata Station, cross-platform transfers between the Jōetsu Shinkansen and conventional lines—highly effective in improving convenience and reducing transfer time—were implemented as part of the grade separation project around the station. Since April 15, 2018, some services have allowed same-platform transfers.

Niigata Prefecture's continued examination of these Mini-Shinkansen and conventional line improvement options for the Niigata — Jōetsu corridor can also be seen as an indication that, at present, the prefecture considers the construction of a full-standard Uetsu Shinkansen in this section to be difficult.

== Ōu Shinkansen ==
Route of the Ōu Shinkansen (shown as a pink dashed line).

The Ōu Shinkansen (奥羽新幹線) is a Kihon Keikaku Rosen of Shinkansen, running from Fukushima (Fukushima) via the vicinity of Yamagata and Shinjō (Yamagata), to Akita (Akita).

There are some movements promoting its development, together with the aforementioned Uetsu Shinkansen, in Yamagata and Akita Prefectures.

Sections of the Ōu Main Line—between Fukushima — Yonezawa — Yamagata — Shinjō, as well as between Ōmagari — Akita—have been regauged to standard gauge and are operated as the Yamagata Shinkansen and Akita Shinkansen, respectively, with through services running onto the Tōhoku Shinkansen. This Mini-Shinkansen approach has reduced construction costs and time compared to full-standard Shinkansen, and has avoided the issue of separating heikō zairaisen (parallel conventional lines) from JR management.

However, these lines are legally still conventional lines. They are not high-speed new lines like full-standard Shinkansen, and their infrastructure remains essentially at conventional-line standards despite regauging. Their maximum speed is limited to around 130 km/h, similar to conventional lines, and due to insufficient upgrades—such as alignment improvements and double-tracking of single-track sections—the distance over which such speeds can be maintained is limited. Including station stops, the average (scheduled) speeds are relatively low: the fastest service between Fukushima — Shinjō averages 83.3 km/h (1 hour 47 minutes), while between Morioka — Akita it averages 92.0 km/h (1 hour 23 minutes). By contrast, even the slower Kodama services on the Tōkaidō Shinkansen—despite frequent stops and overtakes—achieve an average speed of 126.7 km/h (4 hours 4 minutes) between Tokyo — Shin-Osaka.

Because this results in a significant disparity in travel times between areas along the not-yet-high-speed Ōu corridor and those served by Japan's fastest Shinkansen lines, such as the Tōhoku Shinkansen, it has been argued that constructing the Ōu Shinkansen is necessary to reduce regional disparities and to expand economic spheres and population exchange.

In Fukushima, Yamagata, and Akita Prefectures along the route, transfers between Fukushima, Yamagata, and Akita Stations would no longer be necessary, resulting in significant reductions in travel time. In particular, between Yamagata and Akita, there are currently no limited express services north of Shinjō, requiring passengers to transfer between the Yamagata Shinkansen and local conventional trains. As a result, despite being neighboring prefectures, the journey currently takes as long as 3 hours and 23 minutes. With the completion of the Ōu Shinkansen, this section could be traveled directly in approximately 42 minutes. Travel times between Tokyo — Yamagata/Akita would also be significantly reduced. With the opening of the Ōu Shinkansen, the travel times between Tokyo — Akita would become comparable to those between Tokyo — Morioka, and those between Tokyo — Yamagata would become comparable to those between Tokyo — Sendai. This would help correct the disparity in time-distance between Tokyo — Yamagata/Akita and Tokyo — Miyagi/Iwate.

=== List of stations ===
According to a study report by Yamagata Prefecture (not a formally approved plan), the following stations are assumed. Stations in bold are expected to be served by all trains:

Fukushima — Yonezawa — Akayu — Yamagata — Sakurambo-Higashine — Shinjō — Yuzawa — Yokote — Ōmagari — Akita

=== Moves toward developing a full-standard Shinkansen ===
As noted in the Uetsu Shinkansen section, Yamagata Prefecture has sought to further accelerate efforts toward realizing the Ōu and Uetsu Shinkansen as full-standard Shinkansen lines. To this end, on May 22, 2016, it established the Yamagata Prefecture Alliance for the Realization of the Ōu and Uetsu Shinkansen (山形県奥羽・羽越新幹線整備実現同盟, Yamagata-Ken Ōu-Uetsu Shinkansen Seibi Jitsugen Dōmei). On June 20 of the same year, Yonezawa City also established the Yonezawa City Alliance for the Realization of the Ōu Shinkansen (米沢市奥羽新幹線整備実現同盟会, Yonezawa-Shi Ōu Shinkansen Seibi Jitsugen Dōmeikai).

On August 9, 2017, aiming for full-standard development of both the Ōu and Uetsu Shinkansen, a Joint Project Team of Six Prefectures for the Uetsu and Ōu Shinkansen (羽越・奥羽新幹線関係6県合同プロジェクトチーム, Uetsu-Ōu Shinkansen Kankei Rokken Gōdō Purojekuto Chīmu) was established, with Yamagata Prefecture serving as the secretariat. On September 20 of the same year, the Mogami Regional Alliance for the Realization of the Ōu Shinkansen (最上地域奥羽新幹線整備実現同盟会, Mogami Chiiki Ōu Shinkansen Seibi Jitsugen Dōmeikai), centered on Shinjō City in the Mogami region, was also established. On January 5, 2018, aiming to realize the Ōu Shinkansen as a full-standard Shinkansen, the Yamagata Regional Alliance for the Realization of the Ōu Shinkansen (山形圏域奥羽新幹線整備実現同盟会, Yamagata Ken'iki Ōu Shinkansen Seibi Jitsugen Dōmeikai) was established by Yamagata, three neighboring cities, two towns, and local business organizations.

=== Effects ===
The number of trips between Yamagata/Akita Prefectures and the Kantō region was 18,699 passengers per day in FY2010. Of these, rail accounted for 9,852 passengers (52.7%), air travel for 1,671 (8.9%), and automobiles and others for 7,175 (38.4%). For Aomori Prefecture and the Kantō region, the number of trips was 9,999 passengers per day (FY2013), with rail accounting for 7,411 (74.1%), air travel for 1,925 (19.3%), and automobiles and others for 663 (6.6%). Railway journalist Jun Umehara estimates that, with the development of the Ōu Shinkansen, rail's modal share between Yamagata/Akita and the Kantō region would rise to around 74.1%—similar to the Aomori case—bringing the number of rail passengers to approximately 13,856 per day.

The Yamagata Prefecture Alliance for the Realization of the Ōu and Uetsu Shinkansen estimates that, compared to the current Yamagata Shinkansen (Mini-Shinkansen), the opening of the full-standard Ōu Shinkansen would reduce travel times as follows:

- Tokyo — Yonezawa: from 1 hour 56 minutes to about 1 hour 30 minutes
- Tokyo — Yamagata: from 2 hours 26 minutes to about 2 hours
- Tokyo — Shinjō: from 3 hours 11 minutes to about 2 hours 30 minutes

The Akita Prefecture Alliance for the Promotion of the Ōu and Uetsu Shinkansen estimates that, compared to transferring between the Yamagata Shinkansen and conventional lines at Shinjō, travel time between Tokyo — Akita would be reduced from approximately 5 hours 50 minutes to about 2 hours 30 minutes. For reference, using the Akita Shinkansen currently takes a minimum of 3 hours 37 minutes between Tokyo — Akita.

According to a June 21, 2021 announcement by the Joint Project Team of Six Prefectures for the Uetsu and Ōu Shinkansen, estimated travel times would be 1 hour 40 minutes between Tokyo — Yamagata, and 42 minutes between Yamagata — Akita.

=== Tunnel plan for the Fukushima — Yamagata Prefectural border ===
At a meeting on May 12, 2015, between Yamagata Governor Mieko Yoshimura and JR East President Tetsurō Tomita, it was stated that, in order to address service suspensions and delays on the Yamagata Shinkansen caused by heavy rain and snowfall, a study would be conducted over two years (through 2017) on fundamental countermeasures for the section between Fukushima — Yonezawa. After the study was completed, JR East presented an outline of the results to Yamagata Prefecture on November 29, 2017. According to this, constructing a 23 km tunnel called the Yonezawa Tunnel (米沢トンネル, Yonezawa Tonneru) through the Itaya Pass at the border between Fukushima and Yamagata Prefectures would yield an estimated travel time reduction of about 10 minutes, with project costs estimated at 150 billion yen under the assumption of the current Yamagata Shinkansen system. Furthermore, expanding the tunnel cross-section to accommodate a future full-standard Shinkansen—as requested by Governor Yoshimura—would require an additional 12 billion yen. Based on these results, on December 1 of the same year, Governor Yoshimura visited JR East headquarters and requested the early implementation of the tunnel project.

Subsequently, in March 2025, Yamagata Prefecture and JR East conducted a study on the tunnel development plan. According to the resulting report, the project cost increased from the 150 billion yen estimated in 2017 to 230 billion yen due to rising prices and other factors, while the construction period was projected to extend from 15 years to 19 years. Since September 2025, Yamagata Prefecture has been proceeding with meetings to examine specific issues such as the project implementation body and cost-sharing arrangements.

=== Tunnel plan for the Iwate — Akita Prefectural border ===
Although this is not directly related to the Ōu Shinkansen, a similar concept has emerged for the Akita Shinkansen in Akita Prefecture.

In June 2018, it was revealed that JR East had informed local governments in November of the previous year of a plan to construct a new, approximately 15 km long straight tunnel called the Shin Sengan Tunnel (新仙岩トンネル, Shin Sengan Tonneru) between Tazawako — Akabuchi, located on the border between Iwate and Akita Prefectures. Subsequently, on July 26, 2021, Akita Prefecture and JR East signed a memorandum of understanding titled Memorandum on the Promotion of the Shin Sengan Tunnel Development Plan for the Akita Shinkansen (秋田新幹線新仙岩トンネル整備計画の推進に関する覚書). The memorandum stipulates that Akita Prefecture and JR East will cooperate in advancing the project, including conducting studies and surveys for project implementation and lobbying for financial support from the national government. JR East also expressed its intention to bear 60% of the project cost. Later, on December 5, 2024, it was announced that the project cost—previously estimated at 70 billion yen—would increase by 30 billion yen to a total of 100 billion yen. The increase is attributed to rising prices and labor costs, and the construction period is now expected to be extended from approximately 11 years to about 15 years.

The Yonezawa Tunnel concept in Yamagata Prefecture is not only a project to increase the speed of the Yamagata Shinkansen, but is also designed in such a way that it could potentially be repurposed in the future for the Ōu Shinkansen. By contrast, the Shin Sengan Tunnel in Akita Prefecture is likewise a speed improvement project for the Akita Shinkansen, but it cannot be utilized for a future Ōu Shinkansen. In that sense, if the Ōu Shinkansen were to be constructed later, the latter project could be seen as a "wasted investment". In other words, the decision by JR East and Akita Prefecture to proceed with this tunnel could also be interpreted as indicating a lack of immediate intention to move forward with the construction of the Ōu Shinkansen.

== Hokuriku–Chūkyō Shinkansen ==
Route of the Hokuriku–Chūkyō Shinkansen (shown as a pink dashed line).

The Hokuriku–Chūkyō Shinkansen (北陸・中京新幹線) is a Kihon Keikaku Rosen of Shinkansen, connecting Tsuruga (Fukui) with Nagoya (Aichi).

Since the announcement of the basic plan, there have been no concrete developments toward the start of construction, and there has been little to no local movement advocating its realization under the name of the "Hokuriku–Chūkyō Shinkansen". However, as one of the proposed route options for the unbuilt section of the Hokuriku Shinkansen, this route remains a subject of discussion (see below).

When the basic plan for the Hokuriku Shinkansen (Tokyo — Osaka via Nagano and Toyama) was approved on July 3, 1972, the most likely route west of Tsuruga was the so-called Maibara Route (米原ルート, Maibara Rūto), which would run along the eastern shore of Lake Biwa and connect with the Tōkaidō Shinkansen near Maibara Station. However, in the construction plan decided on November 13, 1973, the vicinity of Obama City was added as a major intermediate point. As a result, this separate line—linking the Hokuriku region with the Chūkyō metropolitan area (Nagoya)—was newly included in the basic plan. Although the straight-line distance between Tsuruga and Nagoya is approximately 90 km, the planned route length is about 50 km, assuming partial sharing of infrastructure with the Tōkaidō Shinkansen.

As noted above, there has been little local advocacy for the Hokuriku–Chūkyō Shinkansen itself. However, as of 2026, the route west of Tsuruga for the Hokuriku Shinkansen—once decided as the Obama–Kyoto route (via Obama and then south through Kyoto)—has not yet entered construction, and there are calls in some quarters (such as Ishikawa Prefecture and the Japan Innovation Party) to reconsider the route. One of the alternatives under discussion is the Maibara Route, which is essentially identical to the route envisioned for the Hokuriku–Chūkyō Shinkansen in 1972. (That said, if through services onto the Tōkaidō Shinkansen were implemented beyond Maibara, the Hokuriku Shinkansen would continue toward Osaka, while the Hokuriku–Chūkyō Shinkansen would be oriented toward Nagoya.)

== Sanin Shinkansen ==
Route of the Sanin Shinkansen (shown as a pink dashed line).

The Sanin Shinkansen (山陰新幹線, San'in Shinkansen) is a Kihon Keikaku Rosen of Shinkansen, running from Osaka, via the vicinity of Tottori (Tottori) and Matsue (Shimane), to Shimonoseki (Yamaguchi).

Local governments in Tottori Prefecture, Shimane Prefecture, and the northern Kansai region have been promoting efforts toward its development. However, such movements are mainly focused on the eastern sections between Osaka — Tottori or Osaka — Izumo, while there is little to no advocacy for the western section between Izumo — Shimonoseki.

The total length is estimated at 550 km, with construction costs projected at around 4 trillion yen. After completion, through services with the Chūgoku Ōdan Shinkansen are envisioned, but there has been no progress in the plan since.

At Shin-Shimonoseki Station on the Sanyō Shinkansen, the track layout was designed to allow for future expansion. This is said to have been intended in preparation for the future construction of the Sanin Shinkansen, and it can be regarded as the only existing infrastructure built with this line in mind.

In order to promote progress on the long-stagnant plan, the San'in Longitudinal Super High-Speed Railway Promotion Council of Municipalities (山陰縦貫・超高速鉄道整備推進市町村会議, San'in Jūkan Chōkōsoku Tetsudō Seibi Suishin Shichōson Kaigi) was established in 2013. Comprising municipalities from six prefectures and chaired by the mayor of Tottori City, the council advocates for the development of a Shinkansen line—including the possibility of maglev technology—that would run longitudinally through the San'in region, connect to the Hokuriku region, and provide direct links from the San'in region to the Keihanshin area (Osaka-Kyoto-Kobe).

If constructed using a maglev system, the line could form part of a Tokyo — Fukuoka travel corridor. In this case, construction costs are estimated at 13,354 billion yen, with benefits of 18,790 billion yen and an annual economic ripple effect of 159 billion yen. If developed using a conventional Shinkansen system, construction costs are estimated at 3,091 billion yen, with benefits of 3,379 billion yen and an annual economic ripple effect of 38 billion yen. In terms of the cost–benefit ratio comparing construction costs with benefits over 40 years after completion, estimates suggest 1.09 for the conventional Shinkansen option versus 1.41 for the maglev option.

If a conventional Shinkansen version of the Sanin Shinkansen were realized, travel times are estimated to be reduced to approximately 1 to 1.5 hours between Tottori — Osaka (currently about 2.5 hours by the limited express Super Hakuto), and about 1.5 to 2 hours between Matsue and Osaka (currently about 3.5 hours via the limited express Yakumo and Sanyō Shinkansen). Compared to a scenario without the Sanin Shinkansen, it is projected that the populations of Tottori and Shimane Prefectures would each increase by several tens of thousands.

=== Route selection ===
The council also has proposed a more practical approach: avoiding the need for new construction in the Keihanshin area—where costs would be particularly high—by sharing infrastructure with the Hokuriku Shinkansen. The line would then branch off near Obama City and proceed via Maizuru, Toyooka, and Tottori. This proposal also allows for single-track sections and the use of Mini-Shinkansen systems as pragmatic measures.

In 2017, in northern Kyoto Prefecture—which had been excluded from the Hokuriku Shinkansen route—the Alliance for Promoting the Northern Kyoto Route of the Hokuriku Shinkansen (北陸新幹線京都府北部ルート誘致促進同盟会) was renamed the Alliance for Promoting the Northern Kyoto Route and Railway High-Speed Development (京都府北部ルート誘致・鉄道高速化整備促進同盟会, Kyōto-Fu Hokubu Rūto Yūchi Tetsudō Kōsokuka Seibi Sokushin Dōmeikai), and began advocating for the Sanin Shinkansen.

This organization positions the Sanin Shinkansen as a key line that would connect major regions along the Sea of Japan coast with major cities nationwide, forming a Sea of Japan National Axis (日本海国土軸, Nihonkai Kokudo-Jiku) and strengthening links between regions on the Sea of Japan side and those on the Pacific side. It argues that routing the line through northern Kyoto Prefecture—an important area along the Sea of Japan—would contribute to regional development and revitalization, and ultimately serve the national interest. Accordingly, it calls for the line to pass through northern Kyoto.

== Chūgoku Ōdan Shinkansen ==
Route of the Chūgoku Ōdan Shinkansen (shown as a pink dashed line).

The Chūgoku Ōdan Shinkansen (中国横断新幹線; "Trans-Chūgoku Shinkansen") is a Kihon Keikaku Rosen of Shinkansen, connecting Okayama (Okayama) with Matsue (Shimane). It is envisioned to follow a route similar to that of the limited express Yakumo on the conventional Hakubi Line, and is therefore also referred to as the Hakubi Shinkansen (伯備新幹線).

Efforts to promote its development are led mainly by local governments in Shimane Prefecture. This is because, from the perspective of Shimane Prefecture, the Chūgoku Ōdan Shinkansen would require a shorter length of new construction than the Sanin Shinkansen in order to connect to the Kansai region, thereby lowering the barriers to realizing the project.

=== List of stations ===
According to a study conducted in FY2019 by Professor Satoshi Fujii of Kyoto University (not an officially approved plan), the following stations are assumed. Stations in bold are expected to be served by all trains:

Okayama — Bitchū-Takahashi — Niimi — Yonago — Matsue — Izumoshi

=== Effects ===
If the Chūgoku Ōdan Shinkansen were realized, estimated travel times would be: Yonago — Okayama: 33 minutes, Matsue — Okayama: 44 minutes, and Izumoshi — Okayama: 58 minutes. For all-stop services, estimates include: Yonago — Niimi: 26 minutes, Niimi — Bitchū-Takahashi: 10 minutes, Bitchū-Takahashi — Okayama: 12 minutes, and Niimi — Okayama: 25 minutes. These travel time estimates are based on performance data from the E6 Series Shinkansen trainsets used on the Akita Shinkansen.

According to the Chūgoku Ōdan Shinkansen (Hakubi Shinkansen) Promotion Council (中国横断新幹線（伯備新幹線）整備推進会議, Chūgoku Ōdan Shinkansen (Hakubi Shinkansen) Seibi Suishin Kaigi), assuming construction begins in 2031, is completed in 2045, and partial operations begin in 2046 (with some sections shared with the Sanin Shinkansen), the total project cost is estimated at between 1.11 trillion and 1.27 trillion yen. The projected economic impact includes increases in gross regional product (GRP) of 2.97 trillion yen for Tottori Prefecture and 5.81 trillion yen for Shimane Prefecture, with population increases of 85,000 and 178,000 respectively. For Okayama Prefecture, the GRP is estimated to increase by 0.72 trillion yen and population by 17,000.

== Shikoku Shinkansen ==
The original "Akashi Strait Route" of the Shikoku Shinkansen (shown as a pink dashed line).

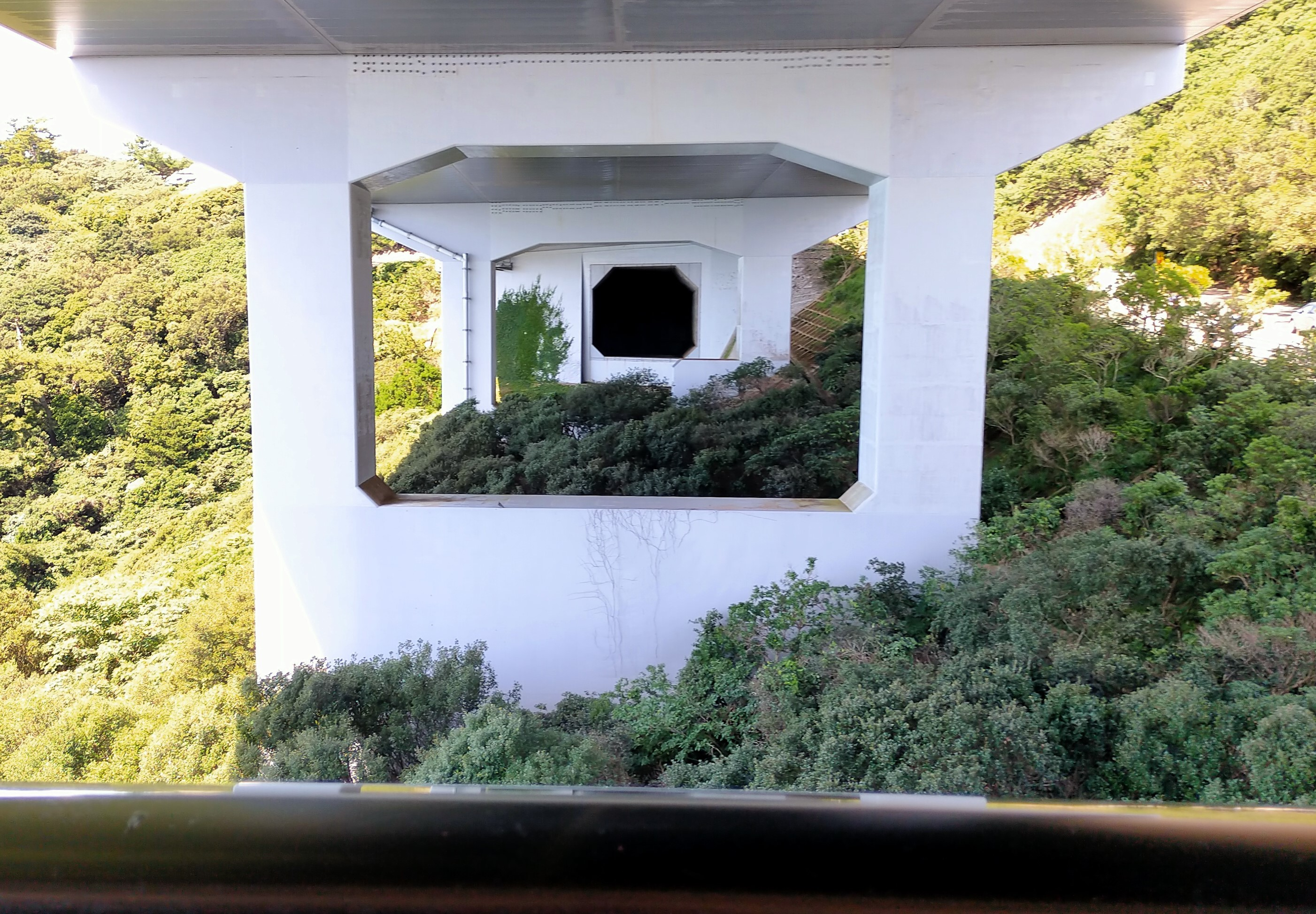
The entrance of a tunnel constructed in advance near the Ōnaruto Bridge, intended for the future passage of the Shikoku Shinkansen, located in Naruto (Tokushima).

The Shikoku Shinkansen (四国新幹線) is a Kihon Keikaku Rosen of Shinkansen that would run through Shikoku, the only one of Japan's four main islands not currently served by Shinkansen. The four prefectures of Shikoku (Kagawa, Tokushima, Ehime, and Kōchi) are jointly promoting efforts toward its realization.

Together with the Chūō Shinkansen and the Kyūshū Ōdan Shinkansen, it forms part of the Pacific New National Axis (太平洋新国土軸構想, Taiheiyō Shin Kokudo-Jiku Kōsō) in the Grand Design for the National Land in the 21st Century, a high-speed rail vision for western Japan. Promotional activities aimed at upgrading it to a formal development plan have intensified since 2011, following the results of preliminary studies.

At the earliest, the extension of the Chūō Shinkansen to Shin-Osaka is expected to be completed by 2037, potentially forming a "Super Mega Region" integrating Japan's three major metropolitan areas (Tokyo-Nagoya-Osaka). The Shikoku Shinkansen Promotion League (四国新幹線整備促進期成会, Shikoku Shinkansen Seibi Sokushin Kiseikai) aims to align with this timeline and target an opening in 2037. After the opening of the Chūō Shinkansen, transfers at Shin-Osaka would reduce travel times between Tokyo and the four prefectural capitals (Tokushima, Takamatsu, Matsuyama, and Kōchi) to within approximately two hours.

Since FY2017, the MLIT has been conducting studies under the Study on the Future of Trunk Railway Networks (幹線鉄道ネットワーク等のあり方に関する調査), including the collection of basic data such as transport density and time distance between major cities, research on efficient Shinkansen development methods (including single-track Shinkansen), methods for upgrading conventional lines, and ways to connect with existing trunk railway networks.

=== Route plan developments ===
Route plans of Shikoku Shinkansen as of 2026

The following three main routes have been considered to date for the Shikoku Shinkansen.

- The Akashi Strait Route (明石海峡ルート, Akashi Kaikyō Rūto):

This is the original route envisioned in the 1973 plan. The route would proceed westward from Shin-Osaka on the Sanyō Shinkansen, branch off beyond Shin-Kobe, and then cross the Akashi Strait to reach Awaji Island. It then cross the Naruto Strait to enter Tokushima (Tokushima) in Shikoku. From there, it would pass through Takamatsu (Kagawa) and Matsuyama (Ehime), and then cross the Hōyo Strait to reach its terminus in Ōita (Ōita) in Kyūshū. The total length between Shin-Osaka — Ōita is approximately 480 km. The plan also envisioned connection facilities near Shirakawa Pass west of Shin-Kobe Station on the Sanyō Shinkansen and near Yoshinari Station on the Kōtoku Line. Accordingly, the Ōnaruto Bridge was constructed across the Naruto Strait to accommodate both road and rail traffic (although no railway is currently in operation). However, the later construction of the Akashi Kaikyō Bridge across the Akashi Strait was changed to a road-only design, meaning that a separate undersea tunnel or bridge capable of carrying rail traffic would be required. Furthermore, because there is currently no bridge or tunnel across the Hōyo Strait, new construction would also be required there.

- The Kitan Strait Route (紀淡海峡ルート, Kitan Kaikyō Rūto):

As the Akashi Kaikyō Bridge was built as a road-only bridge, later proposals have instead emphasized this route. It will head south from Shin-Osaka toward Kansai International Airport (Note: As discussed later, high-speed rail access from central Osaka to Kansai International Airport has long been desired.) and Wakayama, then cross the Kitan Strait to reach Awaji Island. Thereafter, it follows the same alignment as the Akashi Strait Route. Even under this scenario, since there is presently no bridge or tunnel crossing the Kitan Strait, such infrastructure would still need to be built, and the same applies to the Hōyo Strait. The Japan Railway Construction, Transport and Technology Agency (JRTT) conducted surveys of the topography and geology of these straits, but budget execution for these studies was suspended in FY2008. According to a 2014 survey by the Shikoku Economic Federation, the total construction cost in this case was estimated at 4.02 trillion yen.

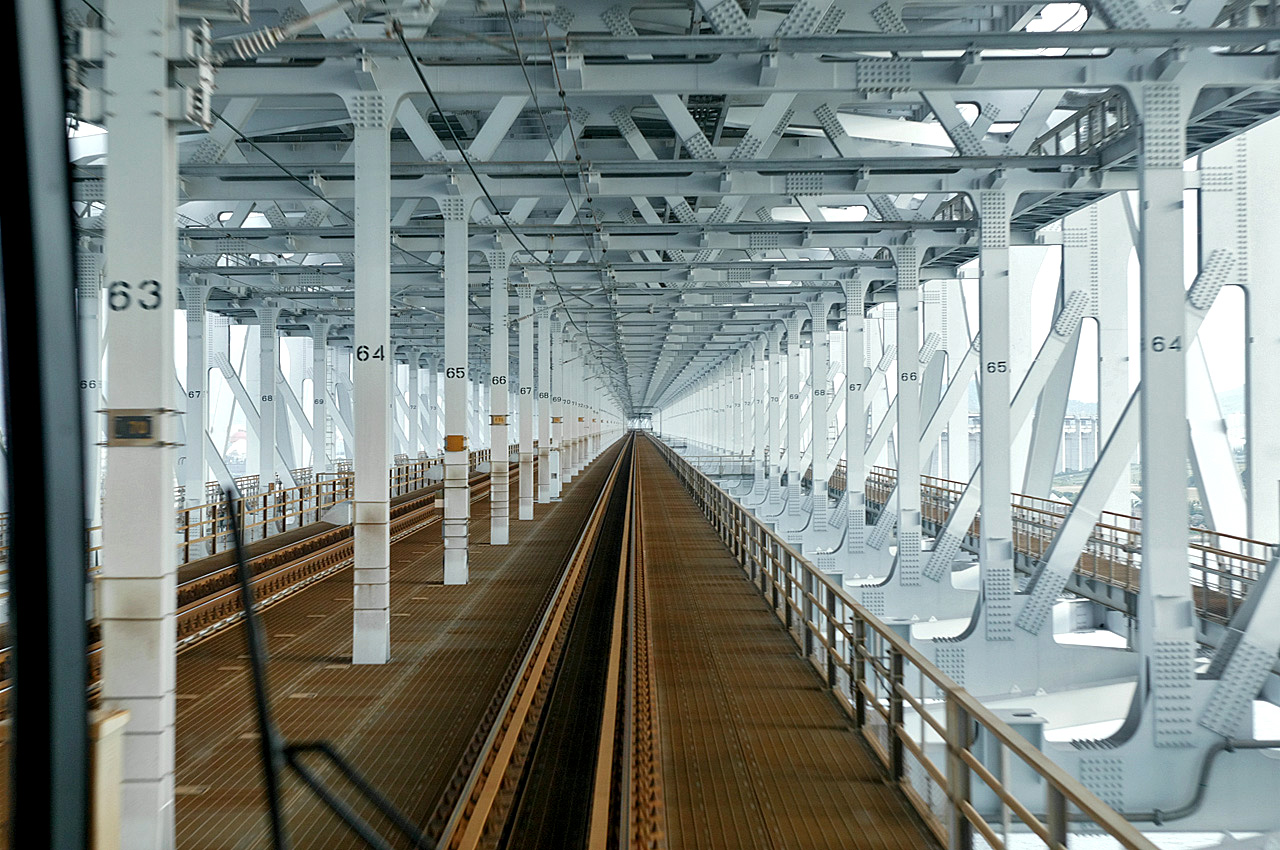
The Great Seto Bridge (currently equipped with only two conventional railway tracks) was designed so that, in the future, it can accommodate two conventional rail tracks and two Shinkansen tracks.

- The Okayama Route (岡山ルート, Okayama Rūto):

A route advocated by the Shikoku Economic Federation from 2014, in which the line would not go through Awaji Island. Instead, it would enter Shikoku from Okayama using the existing Great Seto Bridge (a combined road–rail bridge currently used by conventional railway services on the Seto Ōhashi Line), and then branch toward the three directions, Takamatsu/Tokushima, Matsuyama, and Kōchi. It is also envisaged that services could continue on the Sanyō Shinkansen from Okayama to Shin-Osaka, although this point has not been explicitly stated. The construction of the sections that would require large-scale bridges or undersea tunnels, namely the sections between Shin-Osaka — Awaji — Tokushima and between Matsuyama — Ōita, would be reconsidered only after the routes within Shikoku have been completed. The construction cost for this route (excluding future extension segments) is estimated at 1.57 trillion yen. Because the aforementioned two routes would be prohibitively expensive, the Shikoku prefectures now support this route, and are campaigning for its adoption.
However, within Shikoku, Tokushima Prefecture had a different perspective. If a route from Tokushima were to pass via the Great Seto Bridge, travel to Osaka/Tokyo would become significantly more indirect. For them, compared to a route via Awaji Island, the time-saving benefits would be limited, and fares would be much higher. For this reason, the prefecture had previously supported the Kitan Strait Route. Nevertheless, in May 2023, the governor announced a shift in position, prioritizing the Okayama Route in coordination with the other three prefectures in order to accelerate realization of the Shikoku Shinkansen.
In contrast to the four prefectures of Shikoku, the governor of Okayama Prefecture—which would see relatively limited benefits from the Shikoku Shinkansen—expressed a cautious stance toward the Okayama Route.
In addition, if the Okayama Route were to be constructed, the parallel conventional Seto-Ōhashi Line would suffer a sharp decline in revenue because the existing limited express services would no longer operate on it. However, the section between Okayama — Kojima on the Seto-Ōhashi Line falls under the jurisdiction of JR West, not JR Shikoku, which would be the operating body of the Shikoku Shinkansen. Therefore, this section would be unlikely to qualify for management separation as a so-called heikō zairaisen. (Note: There is a precedent for this in the case of JR Hokkaidō's Hokkaidō Shinkansen, where JR East's Tsugaru Line was not treated as a heikō zairaisen.) In other words, JR West would be highly likely to suffer disadvantages under the Okayama Route, although the consent and cooperation of JR West would be indispensable if the Okayama Route envisions through service onto the Sanyō Shinkansen.

== Shikoku Ōdan Shinkansen ==
Route of the Shikoku Ōdan Shinkansen (shown as a pink dashed line).

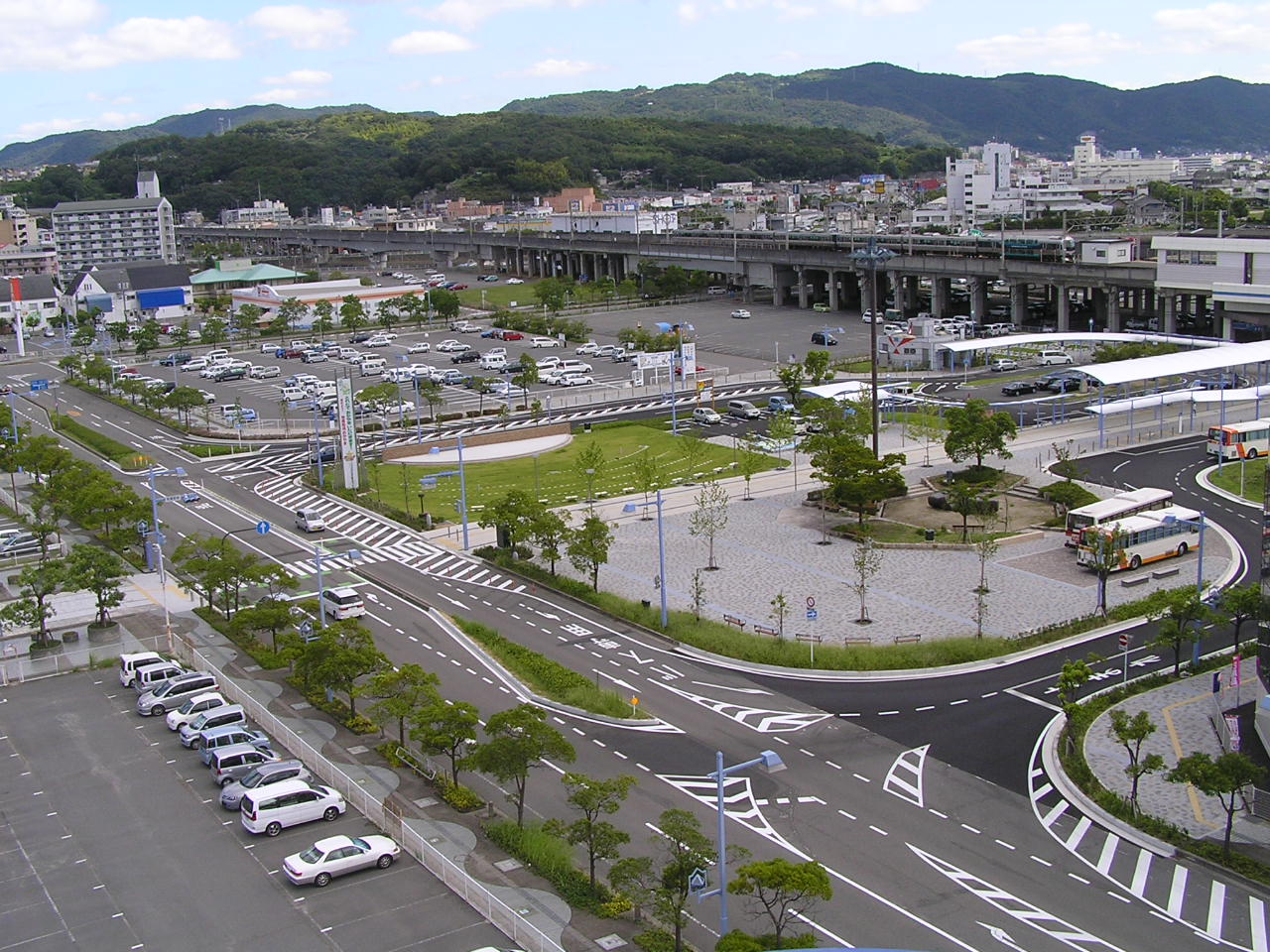
The west exit of Kojima Station consists of a large station plaza and parking area, reserved in anticipation of the future Shikoku Ōdan Shinkansen.

The Shikoku Ōdan Shinkansen (四国横断新幹線; "Trans-Shikoku Shinkansen") is a Kihon Keikaku Rosen of Shinkansen, starting from Okayama (Okayama) to Kōchi (Kōchi). It is often discussed together with the Shikoku Shinkansen mentioned above.

The Great Seto Bridge and its connecting sections were constructed to Shinkansen standards. However, since no government budget was allocated in 2008, the preliminary national surveys required for construction have not been carried out. At Kojima and Utazu Stations, land reserved for future Shinkansen platforms currently exists as large station forecourts.

In the context of efforts to promote the Shikoku Shinkansen, the Okayama Route proposed since 2014 envisions entering Shikoku from Okayama via the Great Seto Bridge, and then branching toward the three directions, Takamatsu/Tokushima, Matsuyama, and Kōchi. As a result, this Okayama Route effectively encompasses the entire originally envisioned route of the Shikoku Ōdan Shinkansen as well.

== Higashi Kyūshū Shinkansen ==
The original "Nippō Main Line Route" of the Higashi Kyūshū Shinkansen (shown as a pink dashed line).

The Higashi Kyūshū Shinkansen (東九州新幹線; "East Kyūshū Shinkansen") is a Kihon Keikaku Rosen of Shinkansen, running from Fukuoka (Fukuoka) to Kagoshima (Kagoshima) via areas near Ōita (Ōita) and Miyazaki (Miyazaki).

At present, promotional efforts for its development are being carried out in Ōita and Miyazaki Prefectures. A notable feature is that each prefecture has proposed candidate routes that differ significantly from the original plan.

Around Ōita City, connections are planned with other Kihon Keikaku Rosen, namely the Shikoku Shinkansen and the Kyūshū Ōdan Shinkansen.

The eastern Kyūshū coastal region has historically lagged behind western Kyūshū in terms of railway upgrades and expressway development (such as the Higashikyūshū Expressway), and was once even referred to as the "backside of Kyūshū" or a "land-locked island". In recent years, infrastructure has improved with the opening of expressways and the upgrading of conventional rail lines, but many still argue that development remains insufficient.

The Higashi Kyūshū Shinkansen Railway Development Promotion Council (東九州新幹線鉄道整備促進期成会, Higashi Kyūshū Shinkansen Tetsudō Seibi Sokushin Kiseikai), composed of four prefectures—Fukuoka, Ōita, Miyazaki, and Kagoshima—and Kitakyūshū City, along with the East Kyūshū Axis Promotion Organization (東九州軸推進機構, Higashi Kyūshū-Jiku Suishin Kikō), which is organized by the Kyūshū Economic Federation and other groups, has been petitioning the national government to upgrade the line to Seibi Shinkansen status. In addition, in the autumn of 2012, the Kyūshū Regional Governors' Association adopted a special resolution calling for its elevation to Seibi Shinkansen status.

The Mayor of Kitakyūshū has also expressed interest in a plan that would pass via Kitakyūshū Airport. Additionally, a 2016 survey report by the Higashi Kyūshū Shinkansen Railway Development Promotion Council noted that routing the line via airports such as Kitakyūshū Airport, Miyazaki Airport, and Kagoshima Airport could also be considered a viable option.

=== Route plans by Ōita Prefecture ===
Route plans of Higashi Kyushu Shinkansen as of 2026

In 2023, Ōita Prefecture conducted a survey on the section of the Higashi Kyūshū Shinkansen between Fukuoka and Ōita, and announced the results on November 21 of the same year. (The section south of Ōita was outside the scope of the survey.) In this study, two route options were examined.

- The Nippō Main Line Route (日豊本線ルート, Nippō Honsen Rūto): This is the route that was originally envisioned in the basic plan for the Higashi Kyūshū Shinkansen. Organizations such as the Higashi Kyūshū Shinkansen Railway Development Promotion Council also studied and promoted this route. From Hakata (Fukuoka) to Kokura (Kitakyūshū), the line would run eastward on the Sanyō Shinkansen, then branch south from Kokura along the Nippō Main Line, via Ōita and Miyazaki toward Kagoshima-Chūō. The cost-benefit ratio for the section between Hakata — Ōita was calculated as 1.27.

As mentioned earlier, this route assumes that the section between Hakata — Kokura would utilize the existing Sanyō Shinkansen. Since the Sanyō Shinkansen is operated entirely by JR West, JR Kyūshū would lose revenue from the Hakata — Kokura segment under this arrangement. As a result, if the project were to move forward, it is expected that JR Kyūshū would be reluctant to support the construction of this route.

- The Kyūdai Main Line Route (久大本線ルート, Kyūdai Honsen Rūto): The newly proposed route. From Hakata, the line would proceed south on the Kyūshū Shinkansen, branch eastward from Shin-Tosu in Saga Prefecture, and head toward Ōita along the Kyūdai Main Line. The 1973 Basic Plan for the Higashi Kyūshū Shinkansen only stipulated "Starting point: Fukuoka", "Terminal: Kagoshima", and "Major intermediate locations: vicinity of Ōita and Miyazaki", meaning that Kitakyūshū was not mentioned, which makes it possible to envision a route of this kind as well. The cost-benefit ratio for the section between Hakata — Ōita was calculated as 1.23, indicating that the Nippō Route was slightly superior.

One advantage of the Kyūdai Route is that it can avoid the previously mentioned issue of through service onto the Sanyō Shinkansen (and the resulting loss of revenue for JR Kyūshū). Also, this route would shorten both the distance and travel time between Ōita — Fukuoka, which is the corridor with the highest demand from Ōita. On the other hand, if this route is adopted, travel between Ōita — Kitakyūshū, or from Ōita toward Honshū, would become more circuitous, reducing time-saving benefits. Furthermore, Saga Prefecture would also become a prefecture along the line and would therefore be required to bear part of the construction costs. (Saga Prefecture is well known for opposing the full-standard construction of the Nishi Kyūshū Shinkansen through its territory.)
Reacting to the survey by Ōita Prefecture, Kitakyūshū City, in its 2024 Proposals to the National Government, added two requests: that the development plan for the Higashi Kyūshū Shinkansen be formulated with Kitakyūshū as the starting point (or branching point), and that construction of the section between Kitakyūshū — Ōita be commenced at an early stage.

==== Demand ====
Railway journalist Jun Umehara notes that the number of limited express train users between Fukuoka — Ōita reaches about 11,000 per day. He points out that this level is comparable to the roughly 5,000 passengers per day between the Greater Tokyo Area and Toyama/Ishikawa (served by the Hokuriku Shinkansen), and the 14,000 passengers per day between the Kansai region and Fukui/Toyama/Ishikawa. Furthermore, compared to the Hokuriku region—where rail usage has traditionally been high—only 7.8% of travelers between Fukuoka — Ōita use rail. He estimates that the introduction of a high-speed Shinkansen service could significantly expand latent demand.

According to estimates by the Higashi Kyūshū Shinkansen Railway Development Promotion Council, the projected daily ridership between Hakata — Ōita is 23,973 passengers for the Nippō Route and 22,163 passengers for the Kyūdai Route. In these estimates, assuming a social discount rate of 2%, the cost-benefit ratios are 1.27 for the Nippō Route and 1.23 for the Kyūdai Route.

==== Travel time ====
While there is still no clear prospect for the start of construction of the Higashi Kyūshū Shinkansen, efforts have been made to increase speeds on the conventional Nippō Main Line. These include track improvements and the introduction of tilting trainsets such as the 883 and 885 series. The limited express Sonic connects Hakata — Ōita in about two hours, reducing travel time by approximately 20 minutes compared to before.

In 2016, the Higashi Kyūshū Shinkansen Railway Development Promotion Council estimated travel times between major stations under two scenarios: one assuming trains operate along the same route as the Nippō Main Line at an average speed of 180 km/h (similar to the Hokuriku Shinkansen), and another assuming a Shinkansen-optimized route (380 km in length) with an average operating speed of 210 km/h (similar to the Kyūshū and Hokuriku Shinkansen). These estimates demonstrated significant time savings.

Furthermore, in 2023, the council published a comparative study including both the Nippō Main Line and Kyūdai Main Line Routes. At that time, travel from Ōita to Hakata took about two hours, and to Osaka more than four hours. With the Higashi Kyūshū Shinkansen, travel times are estimated to be reduced to 47 minutes between Ōita — Hakata and about 3.5 hours between Ōita — Osaka via the Nippō Route, or 46 minutes between Ōita — Hakata and slightly over four hours between Ōita — Osaka via the Kyūdai Route. Additionally, travel time between Kumamoto — Ōita is estimated at 79 minutes via the Nippō Route and 56 minutes via the Kyūdai Route.

Travel time between major stations [minutes]
		Current conventional lines	Shinkansen (Time-saving effects)	
		Current conventional lines	Estimates by Ōita Prefecture	Estimates by the Council
Ōita	— Kokura	83	—	31 (-52)
Ōita	— Hakata	125	60 (-65)	47 (-78)
Ōita	— Miyazaki	189	69 (-120)	48 (-141)
Ōita	— Kagoshima-Chūō	318	111 (-207)	77 (-241)
Miyazaki	— Kokura	272	113 (-159)	79 (-193)
Miyazaki	— Hakata	314	129 (-185)	—
Miyazaki	— Kagoshima-Chūō	129	—	29 (-100)

=== Route plans by Miyazaki Prefecture ===
On December 4, 2024, Miyazaki Prefecture published the Higashi Kyūshū Shinkansen and Related Surveys Report (東九州新幹線等調査報告書) on its official website. The report presents cost-benefit analyses based on estimated construction costs for the following three route options:

- The Nippō Main Line Route (日豊本線ルート, Nippō Honsen Rūto):

The originally planned alignment, running from Hakata to Kokura on the Sanyō Shinkansen, then branch south from Kokura along the Nippō Main Line, via Ōita and Miyazaki toward Kagoshima-Chūō. The newly constructed route (Kokura — Kagoshima-Chūō) would have a length of 379 km, with construction costs estimated at 3,807 billion yen. The projected demand for the Shinkansen's opening year (average sectional daily passenger volume) is 12,416 passengers per day.
Among the three options, this route would require the longest construction length within Miyazaki Prefecture and thus the largest financial burden.

- The Kagoshima-Chūō Priority Route (鹿児島中央先行ルート, Kagoshima-Chūō Senkō Rūto):

This involves first constructing only the Miyazaki — Kagoshima-Chūō section of the original alignment, with through services to the Kyūshū Shinkansen at Kagoshima-Chūō. (Note: However, at Kagoshima-Chūō Station on the Kyushu Shinkansen, simply extending the tracks straight ahead in the existing direction of travel would send the line out toward Kagoshima Bay and Sakurajima. Therefore, if through-service were actually to be implemented, it would likely be essential to connect the route by means of a switchback alignment.) The route would have a total length of 103 km, with construction costs estimated at 1,064 billion yen. The projected demand for the opening year is 5,701 passengers per day.
This route reduces total length and cost burden, but results in more indirect travel toward Fukuoka and Honshū, limiting time-saving benefits.

- The Shin-Yatsushiro Route (新八代ルート, Shin-Yatsushiro Rūto):

This branches from the Kyūshū Shinkansen at Shin-Yatsushiro, follows a corridor similar to the Hisatsu Line and Kitto Line (or the B&S Miyazaki express bus), reaches Miyakonojō, and then proceeds to Miyazaki. In this case, the section between Miyakonojō — Miyazaki corresponds to an advance construction segment of the original plan, whereas the Shin-Yatsushiro — Miyakonojō section is an entirely new route not included in the original plan. The entire route would have a total length of 141 km, with construction costs estimated at 1,498 billion yen. The projected demand for the opening year is 8,710 passengers per day.
This newly proposed route is short, significantly reduces costs, and provides the greatest travel time savings between Miyazaki — Fukuoka (Hakata). On the other hand, this route would be a completely independent alignment that differs entirely from the original basic plan of the Higashi Kyūshū Shinkansen, and therefore lacks a solid legal basis as an official public plan for requesting national government support for development.
In addition, because this route would not pass through northern Miyazaki Prefecture or southern Ōita Prefecture, convenience in those regions would not improve significantly. For this reason, in February 2025, the Ōita–Miyazaki Prefectural Border Five-City Policy Council (大分・宮崎県境5市政策協議会)—comprising the five municipalities of Saiki, Usuki, Tsukumi, Nobeoka, and Hyūga—called on Miyazaki Prefecture to promote the Nippō Main Line route.
Furthermore, this option would also involve Kumamoto Prefecture—which is not part of the original Higashi Kyūshū Shinkansen plan—as a host region, meaning that it would have to bear part of the construction cost. Moreover, there is also a high likelihood that the Hisatsu Line would be separated as a heikō zairaisen (parallel conventional line) and converted into a third-sector railway (or possibly bus services), creating an additional financial burden for the prefecture. As of 2026, Kumamoto Prefecture has not commented on this proposal.

According to the report, the travel time reduction effects of each route are as follows.

Travel time between major stations [minutes]
		Current conventional lines	Shinkansen (Time-saving effects)		
		Current conventional lines	Nippō Main Line Route	Kagoshima-Chūō Priority Route	Shin-Yatsushiro Route
Miyazaki	— Hakata	231	98 (-133)	132 (-99)	84 (-147)
Miyazaki	— Kokura	299	79 (-220)	148 (-151)	103 (-196)
Miyakonojō	— Hakata	196	109 (-87)	121 (-75)	66 (-130)
Miyakonojō	— Kokura	215	90 (-125)	137 (-78)	85 (-130)
Nobeoka	— Hakata	254	75 (-179)	195 (-59)	147 (-107)
Nobeoka	— Kokura	228	56 (-172)	228 (0)	166 (-62)

== Kyūshū Ōdan Shinkansen ==
Route of the Kyūshū Ōdan Shinkansen (shown as a pink dashed line).

The Kyūshū Ōdan Shinkansen (九州横断新幹線, "Trans-Kyūshū Shinkansen") is a Kihon Keikaku Rosen of Shinkansen, planned to run from Ōita to Kumamoto.

There has been little to no promotion movement from local governments along the proposed corridor for this route, and the plan has not progressed.

Although the exact route has not been determined, its length is estimated to be approximately 120 km —about 20% shorter than the existing Hōhi Main Line, which connects Ōita — Kumamoto and has a total length of 148.0 km.

At its starting point in Ōita, connections are planned with the Higashi Kyūshū Shinkansen and the Shikoku Shinkansen, both of which are also Kihon Keikaku Rosen. In particular, together with the Shikoku Shinkansen, this line is positioned as a key component of the Pacific New National Axis (太平洋新国土軸構想, Taiheiyō Shin Kokudo-Jiku Kōsō) concept, a high-speed rail corridor linking Osaka to Kyūshū via Shikoku. However, no concrete plans—such as through services—have been determined.

Because there are no major cities along the route and passenger demand between Ōita — Kumamoto is relatively limited, there has been little momentum toward advancing its construction.

== Other Shinkansen proposals ==
Official Shinkansen plans, other than the earlier Tōkaidō and Sanyō Shinkansen, are limited to those routes designated in the Basic Plan for Shinkansen Railway Lines to Be Constructed (建設を開始すべき新幹線鉄道の路線を定める基本計画), which were announced between 1971 and 1973. However, in addition to these, there have been other proposed routes for which local governments have carried out (or previously carried out) promotional campaigns.

=== Mie Shinkansen ===
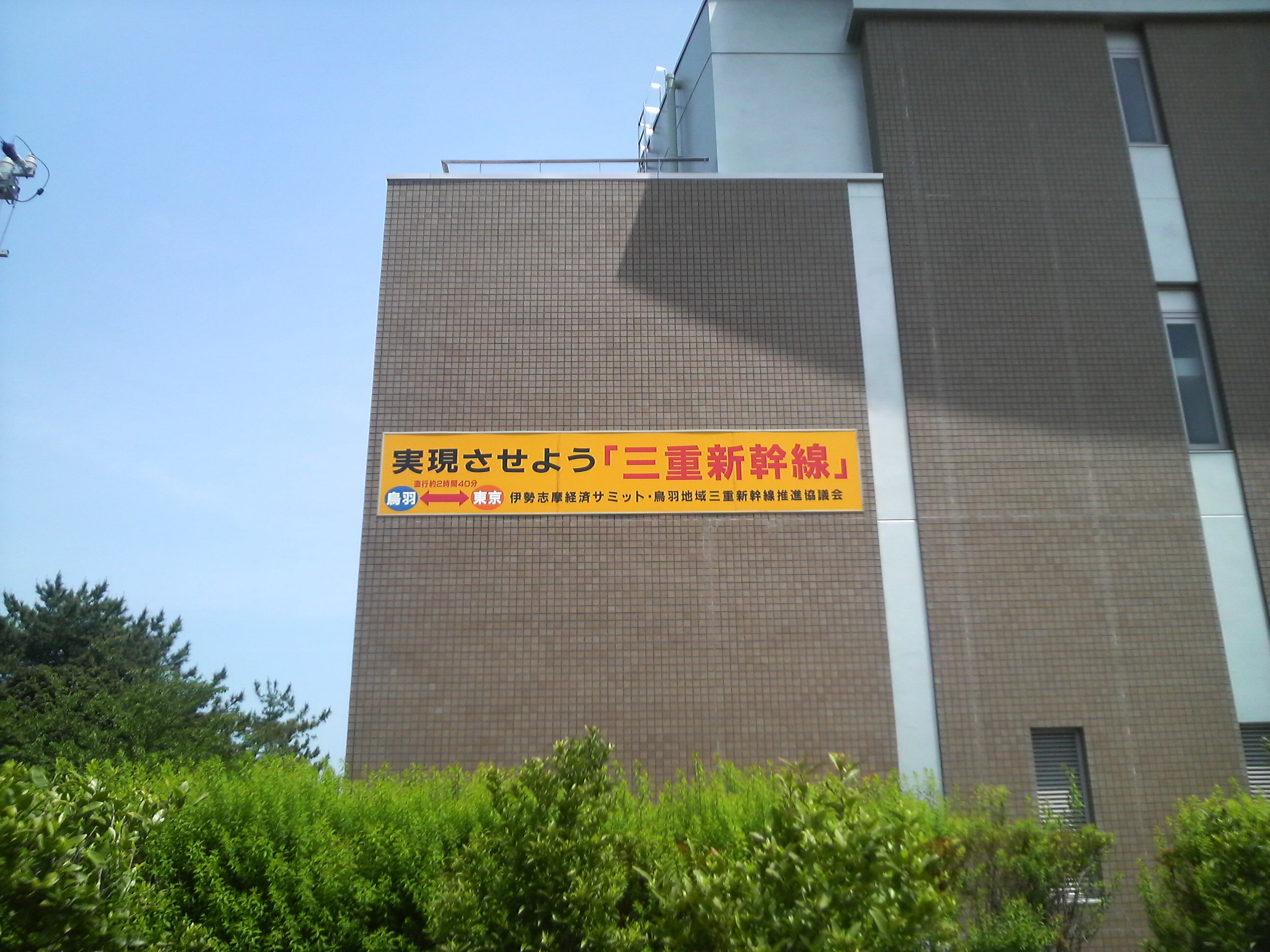
A sign advocating the Mie Shinkansen displayed at the Toba Chamber of Commerce and Industry Hall, Toba (Mie).

The Mie Shinkansen (三重新幹線) is a concept for a Mini-Shinkansen providing direct service between Tokyo and Mie Prefecture. The idea originated during the 1995 gubernatorial election in Mie Prefecture, when gubernatorial candidate Masayasu Kitagawa proposed, as part of his campaign platform, a Shinkansen plan directly linking Mie Prefecture with Tokyo.

After being elected governor, feasibility studies on introducing a Mini-Shinkansen were conducted by the prefectural government, and in 1999 a final report concluding that the project was "feasible" was submitted to the prefectural assembly. In response, organizations such as the Toba Chamber of Commerce and Industry took the lead in establishing the Mie Shinkansen Promotion Council (三重新幹線推進協議会, Mie Shinkansen Suishin Kyōgikai).

However, JR Central expressed the view that implementation was "not feasible under current conditions", and the project failed to materialize before Kitagawa left office in 2003. Following his departure, the plan itself effectively faded away. Nevertheless, promotional efforts—centered on the Toba Chamber of Commerce and Industry—have continued even afterward.

=== High-Speed Rail proposals for access to Kansai Airport ===
Kansai International Airport is located some distance from central Osaka, and significantly improving high-speed rail access from the city center has been a medium- to long-term challenge for strengthening the airport's competitiveness. As a result, various high-speed rail proposals related to Kansai Airport have repeatedly emerged and faded over time.

As noted above, among the proposed route options for the Shikoku Shinkansen, a route passing via Kansai Airport has also been considered as one of the candidates.

==== Kansai Airport Maglev ====
The Kansai Airport Maglev (関空リニア, Kankū Rinia) concept was proposed on July 31, 2009, by then Governor of Osaka Prefecture, Tōru Hashimoto. The plan envisioned connecting Kansai International Airport with central Osaka via a maglev system.

In relation to the management integration of Kansai Airport and Osaka International Airport (Itami Airport), based on the MLIT's Growth Strategy (国土交通省成長戦略) (May 2010), Osaka Prefecture submitted a proposal to the national government in February 2011. In this document, the prefecture requested that the Ministry conduct studies on high-speed access options, including the Kansai Airport Maglev concept, as part of measures to strengthen the airport.

In response, the national government carried out studies in FY2011 to evaluate development effects and other factors. In March 2016, the MLIT compiled the results of its study. It concluded that "at present, demand sufficient to justify the construction cost (on the order of 1 trillion yen) cannot be expected; however, it has been clarified that there are scenarios in which transport revenues would exceed maintenance and operating costs. In order to realize high-speed access rail, it will be necessary going forward to increase demand to a level commensurate with construction costs—through measures such as expanding airport usage via the concession of Kansai International Airport and Osaka International Airport, establishing the former as a hub for LCCs, and enhancing transportation networks such as the Hokuriku Shinkansen and the Chūō Shinkansen".

==== Hokuriku Shinkansen exntension to Kansai Airport ====
The Hokuriku Shinkansen (北陸新幹線) is a Seibi Shinkansen line running from Tokyo through the Hokuriku region toward Osaka. As of 2026, the section between Tokyo — Tsuruga has already opened, but construction has not yet begun west of Tsuruga. (Note: Strictly speaking, this section is part of the Seibi Shinkansen framework rather than the Kihon Keikaku Rosen, but it is discussed here due to its connection with Kansai Airport.)

In February 2016, the Kansai Economic Federation proposed extending the Osaka-side terminus of the Hokuriku Shinkansen beyond Shin-Osaka Station to Kansai International Airport. This proposal was also supported by Kyoto Prefecture and the Fukui Chamber of Commerce and Industry.

However, JR West and Osaka Prefecture argued that the line should first be extended to Shin-Osaka, and that access to Kansai Airport should be considered as a second-stage development. In April 2016, a ruling party committee decided that the Osaka-side terminus would be Shin-Osaka Station.

==== Kansai Airport-Nara Dirent Link Maglev New Branch Line ====
The Kansai Airport-Nara Dirent Link Maglev New Branch Line (関空・奈良直結リニア新支線, Kankū-Nara Chokketsu Rinia Shin-Shisen) is a proposal to construct a single-track, non-superconducting maglev Shinkansen line connecting a planned new station on the Chūō Shinkansen in the vicinity of Nara with Kansai International Airport in approximately 20–30 minutes. Proposed intermediate stations include Yamato-Takada, Gose, Gojō, and Hashimoto, with the terminus at Kansai Airport in Osaka Prefecture. There are also long-term ambitions to connect the line to the Hokuriku Shinkansen near Kyōtanabe.

Shōgo Arai, Governor of Nara Prefecture, campaigned on this proposal during the April 2019 gubernatorial election and was elected. In addition, on June 13, 2019, Nara Prefecture included 25 million yen in its supplementary general account budget for survey and feasibility studies related to the project. However, neither the national government nor railway operators such as JR have made any reference to this proposal.

Unlike the Chūō Shinkansen itself, this concept envisions the use of conventional electromagnetic (non-superconducting) maglev technology, similar to the Linimo. In that sense, rather than serving as a major national trunk Shinkansen line, it is more strongly characterized as a regional line connecting the Nara Basin north–south while providing access to the airport.

=== Route proposals not adopted in the basic plan ===
After the Tōkaidō Shinkansen opened in 1964 and proved successful, movements to attract Shinkansen lines became increasingly active across Japan. Within the same year, construction of what would become the Sanyō Shinkansen was already under consideration. Furthermore, in 1967, a promotion league was established to advance construction of the Kita-mawari Shinkansen (北回り新幹線; "Northern Route Shinkansen"), corresponding to today's Hokuriku Shinkansen. In 1968, a similar group was formed in Kumamoto (corresponding to the present Kyūshū Shinkansen), followed by Kagoshima in 1969, and also in Hokkaidō, where organizations advocating for Shinkansen development were established in succession.

Led primarily by the Liberal Democratic Party (LDP), the construction of a nationwide Shinkansen network was examined multiple times. In March 1967, the Economic and Social Development Plan (経済社会発展計画) was approved by the Cabinet, incorporating a vision for a nationwide Shinkansen network with a total length of 4,500 km. Subsequent studies were conducted, and in July 1969, the Railway Construction Council (鉄道建設審議会) submitted a recommendation to the National Diet to draft legislation for developing a nationwide Shinkansen network. In September 1969, a joint meeting of the LDP's National Railways Basic Issues Investigation Committee (国鉄基本問題調査会) and Transportation Division (交通部会) adopted a policy to develop a 9,000 km nationwide Shinkansen network. Following these discussions, the Nationwide Shinkansen Railway Development Act (1970) was promulgated, and based on this law, approximately 7,000 km of routes were officially announced as basic plans between 1971 and 1973.

In this process, many route proposals were once considered but ultimately not included in the basic plan. For example, route proposals discussed when the Railway Construction Council resolved in June 1969 to examine the Nationwide Shinkansen Railway Development Act, as well as those considered in September 1969 when the LDP's National Railways Basic Issues Investigation Committee established its basic policy on nationwide Shinkansen development, included routes such as the following:

- Asahikawa — Wakkanai (along the Sōya Main Line)
- Asahikawa — Abashiri (along the Sekihoku Main Line)
- Sapporo — Kushiro (along the Sekishō Line and Nemuro Main Line)
- Niigata — Iwaki (along the Ban'etsu West Line and Ban'etsu East Line)
- Tokyo — Iwaki — Sendai (along the Jōban Line)
- Shiojiri — Nagano (along the Chūō Main Line and the Shinonoi Line)
- Nagoya — Shingū — Osaka (along the Kansai Main Line and Kisei Main Line)
- Nagoya — Takayama — Toyama (along the Takayama Main Line)
- Hiroshima — Matsue (along the Geibi Line and Kisuki Line)

In addition, the Chūō Shinkansen was not envisioned in its current route; instead, it was planned as a non-maglev Shinkansen line connecting Tokyo — Shiojiri — Nagoya, along the conventional Chūō Main Line.

These route proposals—amounting to a total of approximately 9,000 km, including those that were adopted as official basic plans—can also be found in the policy platform announced in June 1972 by Kakuei Tanaka, as well as in his book of the same name, Nihon Rettō Kaizōron (日本列島改造論; "Japanese Archipelago Transformation Proposal"). Tanaka used this platform as a campaign pledge, won the party presidential election in July of the same year, and became Prime Minister.

After being excluded from the basic plan, very few of these routes have continued to see organized movements advocating for their development today, with the Mie Shinkansen proposal can be considered almost the only exception. On the contrary, some of the corridors—such as those along the Sōya Main Line and Geibi/Kisuki Lines—are now facing significant depopulation, raising concerns about whether even the existing conventional rail services can be sustained in the future.

=== Extension of existing Shinkansen lines ===
For proposed extensions of existing Shinkansen lines, see the following articles.

==== Hokkaidō Shinkansen extension to Hakodate Station ====
A proposal to extend the Hokkaidō Shinkansen directly from Shin-Hakodate-Hokuto to the central Hakodate Station. Hakodate City has been proactive in promoting the idea, while JR Hokkaidō has taken a negative stance.

==== Akita Shinkansen extension to Higashi-Noshiro ====
A proposal to extend the Akita Shinkansen beyond Akita Station further along the Ōu Main Line to Higashi-Noshiro Station. The proposal has been put forward by Noshiro City.

==== Yamagata Shinkansen extension to Sakata ====
A proposal to extend the Yamagata Shinkansen beyond Shinjō by through-running onto the Rikuu West Line as far as Sakata. While Sakata has actively supported the plan, Tsuruoka—which would not be directly served—has been less enthusiastic. Yamagata Prefecture has effectively abandoned the idea.

==== Yamagata Shinkansen extension to Ōmagari ====
A proposal to extend the Yamagata Shinkansen beyond Shinjō further along the Ōu Main Line to Ōmagari Station in Akita Prefecture. The idea has been advocated by Yuzawa City.

==== Jōetsu Shinkansen extension to Shinjuku Station ====
A proposal to branch the Jōetsu Shinkansen from Ōmiya and extend it to Shinjuku Station. This was originally the planned route of the Jōetsu Shinkansen, but in practice it was instead connected from Ōmiya onto the Tōhoku Shinkansen, resulting in the section between Ōmiya — Tokyo being shared with the latter. As a result, the Ōmiya — Shinjuku section remains an unbuilt line.

As other JR East Shinkansen lines, such as the Hokuriku Shinkansen and Hokkaidō Shinkansen, have been extended, track-capacity issues on the Shinkansen corridor between Ōmiya — Tokyo have come to the fore. As a result, construction of a line between Ōmiya — Shinjuku has periodically been discussed, but it has not been realized due to the high construction costs.

==== Jōetsu Shinkansen extension to the Port of Niigata ====
A proposal to extend the Jōetsu Shinkansen beyond Niigata Station to connect with the Port of Niigata and Niigata Airport. The concept has been proposed by Niigata Prefecture.

== See also ==
- Proposed high-speed rail by country
- Shinkansen
- Seibi Shinkansen, Shinkansen routes planned one year earlier than the Kihon Keikaku Rosen
- Chūō Shinkansen, the only former Kihon Keikaku Rosen from the 1973 announcement on which construction is currently underway.

=== Kihon Keikaku Rosen with existing English Wikipedia articles ===
- Shikoku Shinkansen
- Shikoku Ōdan Shinkansen
