= List of peninsulas of Japan =

Peninsulas of Japan include:

== Hokkaido ==
- Nemuro Peninsula
- Notsuke Peninsula (a sand spit)
- Oshima Peninsula to the south
  - Kameda Peninsula southeast fork of Oshima Peninsula
  - Matumae Peninsula southwest fork of Oshima Peninsula
- Shakotan Peninsula on the most eastern coast
- Shiretoko Peninsula on the east coast

== Honshu ==
- Atsumi Peninsula
- Bōsō Peninsula
- Chita Peninsula
- Ise-Shima
- Izu Peninsula
- Kii Peninsula
- Miura Peninsula
- Natsudomari Peninsula
- Noto Peninsula
- Oga Peninsula
- Oshika (Ojika) Peninsula
- Shimokita Peninsula
- Tsugaru Peninsula

== Shikoku ==
- Sadamisaki Peninsula
- Takanawa Peninsula

== Kyushu ==
- Kitamatsuura Peninsula
- Kunisaki Peninsula
- Nagasaki Peninsula
- Nishisonogi Peninsula
- Ōsumi Peninsula
- Satsuma Peninsula
- Shimabara Peninsula
- Uto Peninsula

== Okinawa ==
- Chinen Peninsula
- Henoko Peninsula
- Katsuren Peninsula
- Motobu Peninsula
- Yomitan peninsula
