= Shikoku Shinkansen =

Japanese Shinkansen (high-speed railway) line

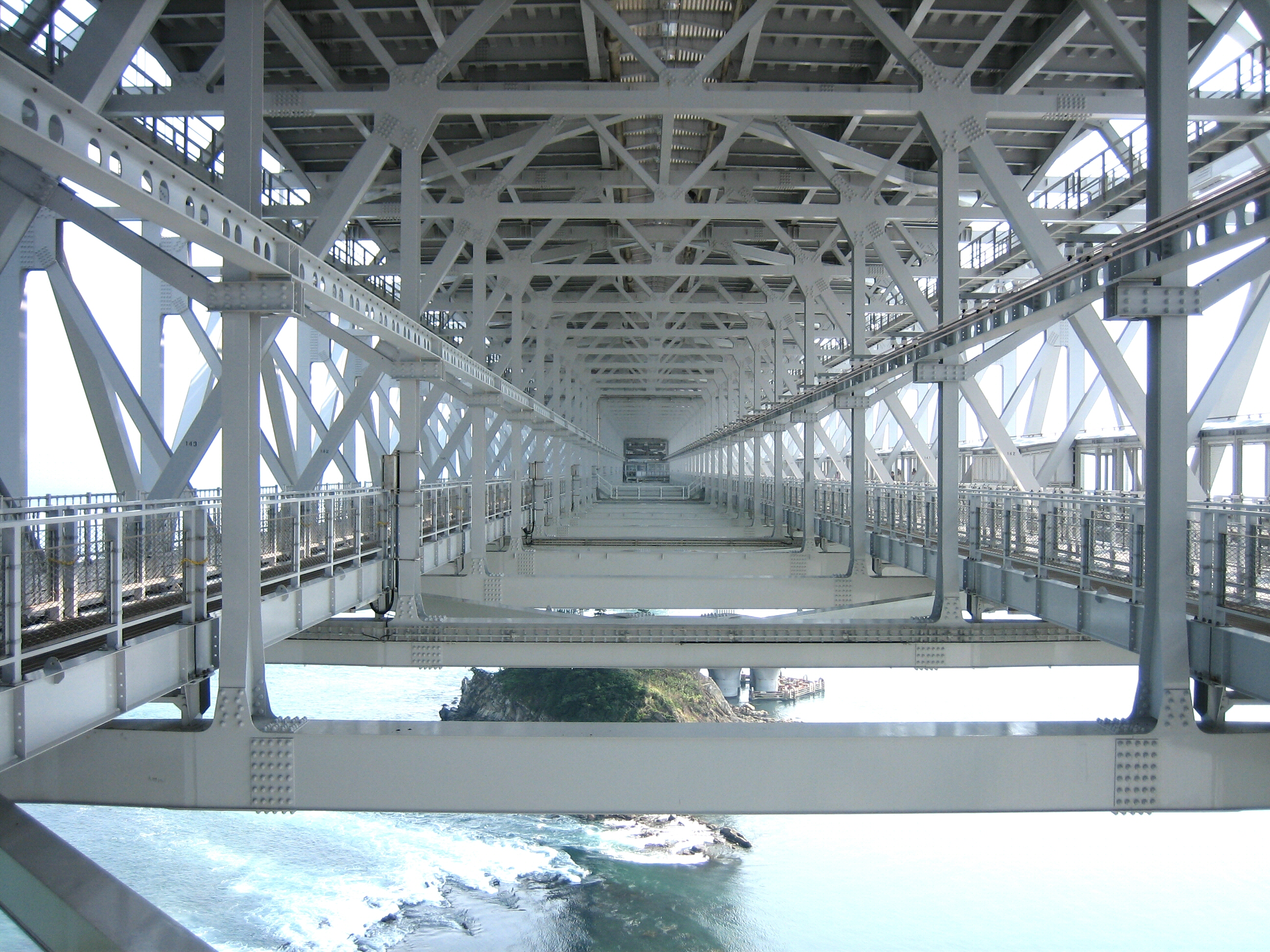
- Lower deck of the Ōnaruto Bridge, which was built to accommodate the Shikoku Shinkansen

Overview
- Status: Planned
- Color on map: Cyan
- Website: www.shikoku-shinkansen.jp

Service
- Type: High-speed rail (Shinkansen)
- System: Shinkansen

Shikoku Shinkansen (Japanese: 四国新幹線) is a general term for two planned Shinkansen routes connecting Honshu, Kyushu and Shikoku. There are two planned routes: the Shikoku Shinkansen and the Trans-Shikoku Shinkansen. Together with the Chūō Shinkansen and Trans-Kyushu Shinkansen, it is a high-speed railway plan for Western Japan that constitutes the Pacific New National Axis in the "Grand Design for the National Land in the 21st Century". Although it is not included in the planned Shinkansen, since 2011, in response to the results of a basic survey, there has been active promotion to upgrade it to a planned development plan. It is expected that the extension of the Linear Chūō Shinkansen to Shin-Osaka Station will be realized as early as 2037, and a "super mega-region" will be formed by integrating the three major metropolitan areas. The Shikoku Shinkansen Development Promotion Association is aiming to open the Shikoku Shinkansen in 2037 to coincide with this. After the opening of the Chūō Shinkansen, travel times between Tokyo and Tokushima, Takamatsu, Matsuyama, and Kochi will all be in the two-hour range, with the exception of transfers at Shin-Osaka.

Since fiscal 2017, the Ministry of Land, Infrastructure, Transport and Tourism has been conducting a survey on the "Form of Trunk Railway Network, etc." to collect basic data on transport density and time distance between major cities, research into efficient Shinkansen development methods including the construction of single-track Shinkansen lines, methods for increasing the speed of conventional lines, and methods for connecting with existing trunk railways.

Shikoku Railway Company (JR Shikoku), the operator of the Shikoku Shinkansen, has included the introduction of the Shinkansen in its medium- to long-term management plans leading up to 2030, "Long-term Management Vision 2030," and "Medium-term Management Plan 2025".

== Overview ==
=== Shikoku Shinkansen ===
The Shikoku Shinkansen will start in Osaka, pass through Tokushima, Takamatsu and Matsuyama, and end in Oita, on the eastern tip of Kyushu. The total length between Osaka and Oita is about 480 km. It is planned to set up connecting facilities near Shirakawa Pass, west of Shin -Kobe Station on the Sanyo Shinkansen, and near Yoshinari Station on the Kotoku Main Line.

It was envisaged that the Awaji Island would be passed between Honshu and Shikoku, and for this reason the Onaruto Bridge was designed as a combined road and railway bridge. However, the Akashi Kaikyo Bridge, which was later constructed, was changed to a road-only bridge, and it became necessary to excavate a separate undersea tunnel through the Akashi Strait or Kitan Strait to allow railway traffic. The Japan Railway Construction, Transport and Technology Agency conducted a survey of the topography and geology of both straits, but budget execution was suspended in fiscal 2008. In addition, a bridge or undersea tunnel (Hoyo Strait Route) is required over the Hoyo Strait to reach Ōita City from Shikoku. The estimated project cost of the Shikoku Shinkansen (Case 1), which requires the construction of a bridge or undersea tunnel over the Akashi Strait, Kitan Strait or Hoyo Strait, is estimated at 4.02 trillion yen.

The Chūō Shinkansen is scheduled to open in Osaka City, where it starts, in 2037. If the Shikoku Shinkansen is constructed as an extension of the Chūō Shinkansen and connected to the Kyushu Shinkansen, which has a large population along the line, via the Hoyo Undersea Tunnel, Tokyo and Kyushu could be connected in less than two and a half hours, and a considerable demand for the Shikoku Shinkansen itself is expected. There is also a plan to build the Shikoku Shinkansen using the linear method, as it could serve as a backup route for the Tokaido-Sanyo Shinkansen and serve as the main transportation system for the second national axis, the New Pacific National Axis.

==== Route plan ====
Early documents from the Shikoku Railway High Speed Liaison Committee and other sources showed a proposed route and station locations, with the line connecting to the Kyushu Shinkansen at Saganoseki in Oita City and allowing trains to continue to Hakata, Kokura, Ōita, Miyazaki and Kagoshima-Chūō stations.

Shin-Ōsaka Station - Tennōji Station - Sennan Station - Kita-Wakayama Station - Kitan Strait - Awajishima Station - Ōnaruto Bridge - Shin-Naruto Station - Shin-Takamatsu Station - Kotohira Station - Shikoku Chuo Station - Iyo-Komatsu Station - Shin-Matsuyama Station - Ozu Station - Shin-Yawatahama Station - Misaki Station - Bungo Strait - Saganoseki Station - Ōita Station A case study conducted in the "2019 Survey on the Status of Trunk Railway Networks, etc." analyzed the construction of a single-track 300 km line with branches and junctions along the way. The route map in the case study does not specify "Shikoku Shinkansen" or "Shikoku Trans-Shikoku Shinkansen," but the content is consistent with the construction plan for the 302 km line in Shikoku. The route map for the Shikoku Shinkansen does not include the names and locations of each station, but the structure of each station and the distance between stations can be read.

Tracks...‖: double track section, |: single track section, ◇・◆: train interchange possible (◆ is a switchback station), ∨: below this point is single track, ∧: below this point is double track

List of stations between K Station - C Station - E Station - H Station

Station Name	Station Structure	Distance From Station A (KM)	Type	Location (TBD)	Remarks
K	Terminal station (2 platforms, 4 tracks)	130	∨		
J	Intermediate station (2 platforms, 2 tracks)	100	｜		
I	Major stations (2 platforms, 4 tracks)	70	◇		
C	Branch station (2 platforms, 4 tracks)	50	◆		Trains running between Station A and Station I/K switch back here
D	Intermediate station (2 platforms, 2 tracks)	75	‖		
E	Branch station (2 platforms, 4 tracks)	95	∨		Trains running between Station A and Station L branch off here.
F	Intermediate station (2 platforms, 2 tracks)	120	｜		
G	Intermediate station (2 platforms, 2 tracks)	130	｜		
Signal Station			◇		In the case of a single track, a signal box is installed to allow for passing of trains.
H	Terminal station (2 platforms, 4 tracks)	175	∧		

=== Trans-Shikoku Shinkansen ===
The Trans-Shikoku Shinkansen, which starts in Okayama and runs towards Kōchi, was designed and planned on November 15, 1973. The Great Seto Bridge and its sections before and after it were built to Shinkansen standards, but because no government funding was provided in 2008, and the national preliminary surveys required for construction were not carried out. The planned sites for the Shinkansen platforms at Kojima Station and Utazu Station are large plazas in front of the stations.

==== Route plan ====
The route listed in early documents from the Shikoku Railway High Speed Liaison Committee and other sources does not include the section from Okayama City across the Seto Ohashi Bridge to Shikokuchūō City, but instead shows a branch line that branches off from the Shikoku Shinkansen at Shikokuchūō City and continues to Kochi City. The intermediate station is listed as "Motoyama Station," which suggests that there was a plan to build a station in Motoyama Town in the Reihoku region of Kochi Prefecture.

Shikoku Chuo Station - Motoyama Station - Kochi Station The case study conducted in the "2019 Survey on the Status of Trunk Railway Networks, etc." includes a route map for the Shikoku Transit Shinkansen. Although the names and locations of each station are not written, the structure of each station and the distance between stations can be seen.

Tracks...‖: double track section, |: single track section, ◇・◆: train interchange possible (◆ is a switchback station), ∨: below this point is single track, ∧: below this point is double track

List of stations between Station A - Station C - Station E - Station L

Station Name	Station Structure	Distance From Station A (KM)	Type	Location (TBD)	Remarks
A	Branch station (2 platforms, 4 tracks)	0	‖		Direct service to major cities using existing Shinkansen lines
Breaching Point		5	‖		Junction with existing Shinkansen lines
B	Intermediate station (2 platforms, 2 tracks)	30	‖		
C	Branch station (2 platforms, 4 tracks)	50	◆		Trains running between Station A and Station I/K switch back here
D	Intermediate station (2 platforms, 2 tracks)	75	‖		
E	Branch station (2 platforms, 4 tracks)	95	∨		Trains running between Station A and Station L branch off here.
Signal Station			◇		In the case of a single track, a signal box is installed to allow for passing of trains.
L	Terminal station (2 platforms, 4 tracks)	145	∧		

== Developments in the 2010s ==
At a press conference on May 25, 2010, when he was confirmed as president of JR Shikoku, Izumi Masafumi stated his desire to increase the speed of conventional railway lines in order to compete with private automobiles, saying, "We may not go as far as the Shinkansen, but unless we can connect cities at around 200 kilometers per hour, there will be no point in having them here."

It was later reported that Chairman Kiyohiro Matsuda and President Izumi mentioned speeding up the line, including a short-circuit on the Yosan Line at the base of the Takanawa Peninsula. President Izumi said the cost of speeding up the line (including the Dosan and Kotoku Lines) would be 150 billion yen, and that they were seeking government support.

The "Shikoku Railway Network Discussion Group", which was established in 2010 by representatives of the Shikoku economy and local governments to discuss railways in Shikoku, reported at its final meeting on July 27, 2011 that it would clearly state in its proposal to be submitted to the national government that the Shinkansen would be introduced to increase speed, and that a super express system would be adopted by improving the tracks of existing railways (see the external link below for details of the proposal).

In its five-year medium-term management plan announced in April 2012, JR Shikoku stated that it would “continue to conduct research to determine the business feasibility of the Shinkansen”.

In April 2012, JR Shikoku President Masafumi Izumi announced that construction of the three remaining sections of the Shinkansen (Hokkaido, Hokuriku, and Kyushu) had been decided, and economic organizations and the four prefectures in Shikoku voiced their calls for the introduction of the Shikoku Shinkansen, saying that "Shikoku will be left behind in the national Shinkansen network." President Izumi said that JR Shikoku's weak profitability was due to its lack of competitiveness with expressways, and stated, "The Shinkansen is essential as an intercity railway. Otherwise, there will be no railways left in Shikoku in 50 years. If it becomes an hour or so from the four prefectural capitals to Shin-Osaka, the state of the region will change." He also criticized the current state of Shikoku, which has been neglected by the national government, saying, "The money spent by the people of Shikoku does not come to Shikoku at all, but goes to Kyushu, Hokuriku, and Hokkaido. The people of Shikoku are modest. I have told the four prefectural governors that 'Shikoku has nice people.' I wonder if it is okay to keep losing out to other regions." He also said that it would be beneficial to have a Shinkansen line in the northern Shikoku region, where there are cities with populations of 100,000 people lined up from Matsuyama to Takamatsu, and that "if the roles were divided, with the Shinkansen for inter-city transportation and conventional lines for urban and regional transportation, it could actually be more convenient. For example, if a Shinkansen tunnel were to be built in the mountainous area at the base of the Takanawa Peninsula in Ehime Prefecture, the Takanawa Peninsula area around Imabari would be left behind. Because it is a region with such a large population, conventional lines have to remain. The Imabari area has economic power." Regarding the financial burden, he explained, "The construction costs of the Shinkansen are probably less of a burden on the local area than public works. Some people say that if all goes well, they can recover the costs through tax revenues. We rely on the national government for support in the form of local allocation tax. Since railways are run by private operators, people tend to think that the private sector should do what it wants, but no matter how you look at it, it is social infrastructure. China and Europe also use public investment."

In December 2012, a symposium entitled "Shikoku's Development and High-Speed Railways" was held at the Saijo City Cultural Hall in Jinhai, Ehime Prefecture, to commemorate the 5th anniversary of the opening of the Shikoku Railway Culture Museum. Suda Hiroshi, a consultant for JR Central, and Umehara Toshiyuki, a consultant for JR Shikoku, pointed out the necessity of the Shikoku Shinkansen. Suda stated that "the key to attracting tourists is to develop a network of various forms of transportation, including railways, and to disseminate local information," and Umehara stated that "the Shinkansen is absolutely necessary to attract large numbers of tourists from Honshu. The population distribution of the Setouchi region makes it possible for the Shinkansen to operate. In order to make Shikoku prosper, the Shinkansen must not remain just a dream."

On January 7, 2013, at a New Year's celebration held in Tokushima City by five economic organizations, including the Prefectural Chamber of Commerce and Industry Federation and the Prefectural Chamber of Commerce and Industry Federation, Tokushima Governor Kamon Iizumi (at the time) stated, "Why is Shikoku the only region without a Shinkansen? I want to make 2013 the year of major action to realize the opening of the Shikoku Shinkansen." Governor Iizumi also stated, "The new national axis is necessary both as an alternative route to the San'yō Shinkansen, and also so that Western Japan can shoulder the burden of Japan in the event of a major earthquake directly beneath the capital."

On April 18, 2014, the Shikoku Railway High Speed Review Preparatory Committee, which was formed by the four Shikoku prefectures, the Shikoku Economic Federation, JR Shikoku, and others, announced a calculation of the project costs and economic effects of constructing two Shinkansen lines, one between Matsuyama and Takamatsu and Tokushima, and the other between Okayama and Kochi. The total project cost was estimated at approximately 1.571 trillion yen, with an average daily user rate of 9,000 people, and an estimated economic ripple effect of 16.9 billion yen per year. Since June 2013, the preparatory committee has been examining the construction of the Osaka-Oita and Okayama-Kochi sections separately, as well as plans to exclude the straits to Osaka and Oita, where project costs are expected to soar. As a result, it was determined that the Osaka-Oita and Okayama-Kochi sections separately would not be profitable, and that only the two lines connecting Shikoku Island and Okayama would exceed the investment criteria. At a press conference held in Takamatsu, Shikoku Economic Federation Executive Director Miki Yoshihisa said, "If things continue as they are, Shikoku will be the only region left without a Shinkansen, but this calculation has made it clear that it is worth making it a reality. We would like to propose this to the national government with confidence," and Ehime Prefecture Planning and Promotion Department Director Kadota Yasuhiro said, "High-speed railways are essential (for the development of Shikoku). We would like Shikoku to work together as one on this." JR Shikoku President Izumi Masafumi stated in a statement, "In order to maintain Shikoku's railway network into the future, we need to increase profits by increasing speed. We would like to work to create momentum for early realization.". The four prefectures and other related parties said they would set up organizations to work on the development and lobby the national government.

On September 2, 2014, the four Shikoku prefectures and the Shikoku Economic Federation established a new organization, the "Shikoku Railway High Speed Liaison Committee," as a successor to the "Shikoku Railway High Speed Review Preparatory Committee." The Liaison Committee plans to create pamphlets and hold symposiums to raise awareness of the introduction of the Shinkansen.

On December 18, 2014, the Economic Association of the four Shikoku prefectures launched the "Study Group on the Shikoku Shinkansen".Members will hold study sessions and make requests to the government.

On February 3, 2015, the Shikoku Railway High Speed Liaison Committee and the Shikoku Railway Revitalization Promotion Association held a symposium entitled "Aiming to Realize the Shinkansen in Shikoku," with the participation of the governors or vice governors of each prefecture in Shikoku, as well as JR Shikoku President Izumi. In his opening remarks, Ehime Governor Nakamura Tokihiro said, "Please understand the information and current situation, and make sure that it is not impossible to realize," and in a discussion session, President Izumi said, "Unless the tracks are fixed, we cannot hope for any faster travel."

On May 27, 2015, representatives of the Shikoku Railway Revitalization Promotion Association (10 people including then-Kagawa Prefecture Governor Keizo Hamada, who was the chairman) visited the Ministry of Land, Infrastructure, Transport and Tourism and conveyed their request to Kozo Fujita, Director-General of the Railway Bureau.

The Ehime Prefectural Assembly adopted a statement of intent calling for the introduction of a Shinkansen in 2012, and the Kagawa Prefectural Assembly adopted a statement of intent in 2014.

In March 2016, prior to the opening of the Hokkaido Shinkansen, the following activities were reported: a symposium was held in Mitoyo, Kagawa Prefecture; a meeting of the economic associations of the four Shikoku prefectures (Matsuyama City) and the adoption of a joint appeal for the realization of the Shinkansen ; and a study group on the effects and challenges of the opening of the Shinkansen, hosted by Kagawa Prefecture and local governments within the prefecture (Takamatsu City) (inviting the head of the Transportation Policy Division of Kanazawa City, which experienced the opening of the Hokuriku Shinkansen).

In January 2017, Wakayama Prefecture, Tokushima Prefecture, and Sakai City held a symposium on the theme of the Shikoku Shinkansen, and in February, Kagawa Prefecture held a symposium on the theme of the Shikoku Shinkansen. It has been reported that there is not a unified stance on promoting these efforts within Shikoku, and that the Ministry of Land, Infrastructure, Transport and Tourism has responded coldly to these efforts.

On March 29, 2016, the Ministry of Land, Infrastructure, Transport and Tourism decided and published the "Shikoku Region Wide-Area Regional Plan." Referring to the fact that the "Shikoku Railway High-Speed Liaison Committee" had conducted a basic survey on future Shinkansen development, the plan for the first time positioned "radical increases in railway speed" as a "long-term issue to be considered."

In addition, the 2017 budget for the Ministry of Land, Infrastructure, Transport and Tourism's Railway Bureau included funds for a commissioned basic survey on railway development, etc., for the purpose of "a survey on the state of trunk railway networks, etc." It states that "based on the effects of the development of trunk railways, etc. thus far, a survey will be conducted on the current state of Japan's trunk railway network and efficient development methods for trunk railways, etc., which will be necessary for the consideration of the state of trunk railway networks, etc., including basic plan routes, in the future."

On February 13, 2017, the Japan Project Industry Council (JAPIC)'s "National Land and Future Project Study Group" compiled a proposal titled "New Projects for a Leap Forward." After exchanging opinions with business leaders and experts from all over the country, the approximately 40 members of the study group narrowed down the initial list of 170 projects to approximately 140, placing emphasis on utilizing private funds and introducing the latest technologies such as IoT, and selected 18 "priority promotion" projects and 22 "recommended" projects. The proposal includes the "BEYOND2020" project, a vision for the future that looks 20–30 years into the future after the 2020 Tokyo Olympics. With the aim of revitalizing the Shikoku region and promoting tourism in the Seto Inland Sea, the government has listed the early construction of the Shikoku Shinkansen using a single-track system as one of its priority projects, and has estimated the estimated construction cost at 1 trillion yen if Okayama-Utazu is double-tracked and Utazu-Takamatsu, Tokushima, Kochi, and Matsuyama are single-tracked. JAPIC Vice Chairman Hideo Nakamura stated, "Only a few of the railways in Shikoku are double-tracked. Single-tracking can be done more cheaply, and there is a global need for it.". Other proposals related to the new Shinkansen line include speeding up the Hokkaido Shinkansen by adding two more Seikan Tunnels, overhauling Shinjuku Station to allow access to the Tōhoku, Jōetsu, and Hokuriku Shinkansen lines, and revitalizing the San'in region with a mini-shinkansen. A symposium was held at the Keidanren Kaikan Building in Tokyo on March 9.

Seeing this change in circumstances as an opportunity, a new organization, the Shikoku Shinkansen Development Promotion Association, was launched on July 6, 2017, reorganized from the Shikoku Railway High Speed Liaison Committee. The inaugural general meeting, held at the Keidanren Kaikan in Tokyo, was attended by 46 organizations, including the Shikoku Keidanren, the four prefectures, the prefectural economic associations, the chamber of commerce federations, the chamber of commerce federations, the tourism associations, the mayors' associations, the town and village associations, and the council chairpersons' associations. Shikoku Keidanren Chairman Akira Chiba (Chairman of Shikoku Electric Power) was appointed as chairman, and the prefectural governors and the heads of the chamber of commerce federations were appointed as vice-chairmen.

In the business plan for fiscal 2017, it was decided that a research report would be compiled within the fiscal year on the direction of regional development in Shikoku using the Shinkansen and the ripple effects on the economy and society. The actual work of the research will be handled by the Shikoku Alliance Regional Economic Research Subcommittee, which is made up of think tanks affiliated with four regional banks: Awa Bank (Tokushima Prefecture), Hyakujushi Bank (Kagawa Prefecture), Iyo Bank (Ehime Prefecture), and Shikoku Bank (Kochi Prefecture). It was also decided that public relations activities would be carried out through the production of a promotional video and the holding of a large symposium.

After the founding meeting, a rally was held, attended by about 600 people, including local Diet members. A resolution was passed calling on the government to include in the 2018 budget research costs for upgrading the Shikoku Shinkansen from a basic plan to a development plan, and to substantially increase the budget for the construction of the new Shinkansen line. On the same day, the group made requests to the Ministry of Land, Infrastructure, Transport and Tourism, the Ministry of Finance, and the Liberal Democratic Party. The resolution stated, "In March last year, Hokkaido to Kyushu were connected by Shinkansen, but Shikoku was left behind as the only region in Japan without concrete plans for a Shinkansen," and "Shikoku is falling far behind in the competition with other regions that are working on regional revitalization." It also stated that in order to realize the national "Regional Revitalization Corridor," "it is essential that Shinkansen lines be established in every area of the country," and positioned the Shikoku Shinkansen as "an essential infrastructure for regional development," claiming that it would also contribute to "the creation of a wide-area exchange zone in Western Japan" and "improving disaster resistance by ensuring redundancy for the national axis" (national resilience). In his opening remarks, Chairman Chiba said, "It is difficult to say that our passion and sincere wishes have been fully conveyed to the nation, and it is extremely important that Shikoku comes together to appeal to change this situation. We would like to use this conference as a new starting point to work even harder than before." Chairman of the Shikoku Bloc Liberal Democratic Party, House of Representatives and House of Councillors Members' Association, Murakami Seiichiro, cited the fact that the Hokuriku Shinkansen and Hokkaido Shinkansen were realized through years of local efforts and stated, "I regret that we did not do this from the time I was elected 31 years ago. With everyone's help, I will work as hard as I can to make progress on the Shikoku Shinkansen within 10 years," setting a goal of realizing the project within 10 years. The governors of the four prefectures also stated their determination, stating, "High-speed railways are a standard infrastructure around the world. Shikoku should not be the only place where there is a gap" (Kagawa Governor Hamada Keizo), "It is also essential for regional revitalization" (Tokushima Governor Iizumi Kamon), "We will pool our efforts in the next 10 years to achieve our goal" (Ehime Governor Nakamura Tokihiro), and "It is especially important in areas with declining populations where productivity improvement is necessary" (Kochi Governor Ozaki Masanao).

On April 1, 2017, the Japan Junior Chamber of Commerce Shikoku District Council, the Shikoku Four Prefecture Block Council, and 28 Shikoku Junior Chamber of Commerce organizations launched a "Shikoku Four Prefectures Simultaneous Signature Campaign for the Realization of the Shikoku Shinkansen." Over 123,000 signatures were collected in six months, and submitted to Keiichi Ishii, Minister of Land, Infrastructure, Transport and Tourism, on November 24 of the same year. Hatsuda Daisuke, Chairman of the Japan Junior Chamber of Commerce Shikoku District Council (currently a member of the Ehime Prefectural Assembly), told Ishii, "We need government investment in infrastructure to get out of the deflationary economy, and the Shinkansen is effective in improving productivity to deal with the decline in the working-age population," and petitioned for the upgrade of the Shikoku Shinkansen Basic Plan to a Development Plan. At the meeting on November 28, Ishii said, "(The momentum) is very strong, and I can feel the enthusiasm."

Meanwhile, in a September 2017 article, Kiichiro Sato, mayor of Oita City, where the Shikoku Shinkansen line terminates, said that based on a 2016 estimate of the total construction costs for land transportation between Oita and Matsuyama for a tunnel (which would be cheaper than a bridge), which came to 1.65 trillion yen, the estimated costs were lower than previously thought and sufficient ripple effects could be expected.

On February 20, 2018, at a press conference, when asked about the possibility of adopting the single-track plan put forward by JAPIC, Minister of Land, Infrastructure, Transport and Tourism Ishii stated, "Regarding the possibility of adopting this plan in Japan or expanding it overseas, we believe that we should first assess the results of the survey, and then explore the needs of the areas along the line and the other countries, while also taking into full consideration the needs of the local areas and the other countries".

== Trends in the 2020s ==
On January 4, 2020, in the back cover of the January issue of Shikoku Chuo City's "Shikoku Chuo Public Relations" published on the same day, Professor Doi Kenji of the Graduate School of Engineering at Osaka University mentioned that if the east-west route from Matsuyama to Takamatsu/Tokushima and the north-south route from Okayama to Kochi intersect around Shikokuchuo City, it would improve Shikokuchuo City's status as a hub and, in some cases, could create a core metropolitan area with a population of nearly 300,000, integrated with Kan'onji and Niihama cities.

On February 12, 2020, Tokushima Prefecture solicited PR slogans from across the country to promote the Shikoku Shinkansen, and selected "Shikoku Shinkansen: Connecting Dreams and Hope to the Future".

On August 3, 2020, the Shikoku Shinkansen Development Promotion Association opened an official Twitter account and began operating it. A mascot character called "Tsunagu-n" was established as the Shikoku Shinkansen support character.

On October 21, 2020, the Shikoku Shinkansen Development Promotion Association submitted a request to the Liberal Democratic Party, the Ministry of Finance, and the Ministry of Land, Infrastructure, Transport and Tourism regarding the introduction of the Shinkansen in Shikoku, including the implementation of a statutory survey as stipulated by the Nationwide Shinkansen Railway Development Act. The request is as follows:

1. In order to position the Shikoku Shinkansen as the backbone of Shikoku's public transportation and to realize it as soon as possible, the national government will take measures in the fiscal year 2021 budget to conduct a statutory survey toward upgrading the development plan.
2. Toward the realization of a "regional revitalization corridor" through the early development of the Shinkansen network and the realization of a multi-core collaborative national land formation in the post - COVID era, the Shinkansen development system will be fundamentally reformed, including by expanding the Shinkansen development budget and utilizing new financial resources. Regarding surveys to be conducted to strengthen the junction function of Shin-Osaka Station as the" regional revitalization corridor central station" and to eliminate track capacity constraints, the development of the Shinkansen in Shikoku will be taken into consideration.
3. The government will continue to provide support to JR Shikoku so that the company can establish an independent and sustainable management. The government will provide guidance to ensure that the opinions of the local community, including those regarding the Shinkansen, are reflected in the mid- to long-term plan that the company will formulate by the end of fiscal 2020.

On February 12, 2021, the Kagawa Economic Association made a proposal to the prefecture to advance discussions on the introduction of the Shikoku Shinkansen. The proposal includes starting consideration of the location of the line and stations, and concretely showing the economic effects to local residents. There are four proposals for the image of the station, including one to be adjacent to JR Takamatsu Station and one to have it connect to Takamatsu Airport. One of the proposals, one to be adjacent to JR Ritsurin Station, was also put forward by the Honshu-Shikoku Bridge Authority.

On March 31, 2021, JR Shikoku announced its medium- to long-term management plan through to 2030, which includes the introduction of the Shinkansen.

On May 24, 2021, the Ehime Economic Association’s Infrastructure Development Committee produced a “Shikoku Shinkansen Mini Flag” and distributed it to Ehime Economic Association members and others to build momentum for the realization of the Shikoku Shinkansen.

On May 30, 2021, the Tokushima Shimbun reported that the Shikoku Shinkansen Development Promotion Association will investigate the location of Shinkansen stations and the effects of their development as a new project for fiscal 2021.

On June 7, 2021, Wakayama Prefecture included the Shikoku Shinkansen in its proposals and requests to the national government in its "Proposals and Requests Regarding National Policies and Budgets for FY2022".

On March 9, 2022, at the symposium "National Land Development Project Concept" of the JAPIC "National Land and Future Project Study Group" held at the Keidanren Kaikan in Tokyo, two priority projects were proposed for Shikoku out of the 12 priority projects nationwide: "Single-track Shinkansen and Regional Development in All Shikoku Prefectures" and "Setouchi Cruise Network Concept ". The former was announced by Director Masahiro Iwano of Taisei Corporation, and the latter by Executive Managing Director Osamu Ochi of Goyo Construction. The presentation of the 12 priority projects can be viewed on YouTube. The "Single-track Shinkansen and Regional Development in All Shikoku Prefectures" concept consists of four projects: "1. Shikoku Shinkansen utilizing the single-track system," "2. International Comprehensive Sports City Concept," "3. Improving the efficiency of public transportation with the introduction of the Shinkansen," and "4. Shikoku version of the transport union ".

On June 1, 2022, the Shikoku Shinkansen Development Promotion Association published a report titled "Shinkansen Changes Cities - Survey on Shinkansen and Urban Development in Shikoku." The report was compiled by the Shikoku Alliance Regional Economic Research Association and includes station development plans and their economic effects. A total of 10 development plans were proposed in the four prefectures.

On September 23, 2022, the Shikoku District Council of the Japan Junior Chamber of Commerce held a symposium entitled "COME ON SHIKOKU Shinkansen" at Sakaide Civic Hall, with panelists including Diet member Shingo Miyake and influencers.

On May 25, 2023, Tokushima Prefecture Governor Masazumi Gotoda announced at the Kinki Block Governors' Conference held in Tottori City that Tokushima Prefecture would withdraw its request for the Awaji Island route and support the Okayama route, indicating that the four Shikoku prefectures would work together to ask the national government to realize the Okayama route. In response to this statement, JR Shikoku President Yoshihiro Nishimaki expressed his hopes for the realization of the plan at a press conference on the 30th. Nishimaki commented, "I think the Okayama route alone would be cheaper to build, so the hurdles would be lower."

On June 6, 2023, at the Shikoku Governors' Conference held in Ozu, Ehime Prefecture, Gotoda stated, "When it came to the Awaji Route, the government and Diet members made almost no moves, and it remained in name only. My idea is that the four Shikoku prefectures should come together and start a realistic dream again." After reiterating his intention to promote the plan via the Okayama route requested by the other three prefectures, he stated, "I want the four Shikoku prefectures to come together and work toward a realistic dream, and start the dream of the Shikoku Shinkansen once again." The governors of Ehime, Kagawa, and Kochi prefectures responded very favorably to this statement.

A reporter from Shikoku Broadcasting System praised Gotoda for expressing his intention to prioritize the development of the Okayama route of the Shikoku Shinkansen, which was welcomed by the governors of the other three prefectures and by the business community. However, he pointed out that there was also strong support for the Awaji Island route within Tokushima Prefecture, and that there was a challenge for Gotoda in terms of how he could gather opinions within the prefecture.

On June 16, 2023, following a report from the Council on Economic and Fiscal Policy, the Second Kishida Cabinet (First Reshuffle) adopted the "Basic Policy for Economic and Fiscal Management and Reform 2023: Accelerating New Capitalism - Expanding Investment for the Future and Realizing Structural Wage Increases" (Basic Policy for Economic and Fiscal Management and Reform 2023) at a Cabinet meeting. It states that "investigations and considerations will be conducted on future directions in accordance with regional conditions, such as the enhancement of basic plan routes and trunk railway networks, etc." This is the first time that an investigation into basic plan routes has been included in a Basic Policy. The same wording was also included in the Third National Land Development Plan (National Plan), which was approved by the Cabinet on July 28.

Following the decision on the national plan, the Shikoku Regional Development Bureau is formulating the next plan for the "Shikoku Regional Plan." The next plan (draft) was discussed at the "4th Shikoku Regional Plan Experts' Conference" on October 6, and based on the proposals of the Shikoku Business Federation, the plans of Tokushima Prefecture, Kagawa Prefecture, and Ehime Prefecture, and the opinions of experts, the plan mentioned "the realization of the Shikoku Shinkansen" and "the positioning of the Shikoku Shinkansen" as "major measures" to achieve the goal.

A reporter from Ai TV points out the vulnerability of a high-speed transportation network that relies on air routes and the usefulness of redundancy provided by the Shinkansen. In an article posted on the company's news site on January 8, 2024, the reporter wrote that on January 3, 2024, when a passenger was trying to return to Matsuyama by changing planes at Haneda Airport from Wakkanai Airport, his arrival at Haneda was delayed due to the impact of the Japan Airlines Flight 516 crash and fire accident at Haneda Airport on the previous day, the 2nd, and his flight to Matsuyama was canceled. He tried to change to a flight on the morning of the 4th, but that was also canceled, and he had to change between the Shinkansen "Nozomi" and the limited express "Shiokaze" to get there. returned to Matsuyama from Shinagawa Station. Regarding the concept of the Shikoku Shinkansen, the reporter mentioned that it would take about an hour and a half to get from Matsuyama to Shin-Osaka by Shinkansen, and Tokyo would be within 3 hours by transferring to the Linear Chūō Shinkansen, and wrote that he felt that many people would find the Shikoku Shinkansen useful. The day before this accident, the Noto Peninsula earthquake of 2024 occurred. The Hokuriku Shinkansen, which was one of the first to be restored to service, played a "rescue role" for the planes that were unable to operate due to the earthquake and accident.

On February 16, 2025, a symposium was held in Takamatsu City to discuss the introduction of the Shinkansen to Shikoku. The symposium was attended by Okayama City Mayor Masao Omori and Shibaura Institute of Technology Professor Shigeshi Iwakura, with Mayor Omori stating, "If a Shinkansen line is built between Shikoku and Shikoku, economic exchange will be invigorated, and we would like to take a positive approach to the introduction of the Shinkansen in Shikoku." Professor Iwakura also stated in his lecture that "the large construction costs can be recovered through increased tax revenues from the opening of the Shinkansen line. "

The professor also explained that “local governments along the railway line are only responsible for paying about 15 percent of the construction costs.” He added, “Shikoku and Okinawa are the only areas in Japan that do not have a Shinkansen. There is room for discussion about how to maintain and develop Shikoku and build a good future for our children. ”

== Effect of development ==
Quantitative benefits of the development include economic ripple effects, reduced travel times, and elimination of transfers.

- The economic ripple effect along the four prefectures due to an increase in the number of passengers for tourism, business, etc. is estimated to be a maximum of 16.9 billion yen per year (Case 3).
- The reduction in travel time to Shin-Osaka is estimated to be 133 minutes less in Tokushima (Case 1), 43 minutes less in Takamatsu (Case 1), 112 minutes less in Matsuyama (Case 1 and 3), and 104 minutes less in Kochi (Case 3) due to the increased speed and improved transfer convenience. This will reduce travel time to 1/4 to 1/2 of the current time. The competing travel time by air is 139 minutes from Matsuyama to Osaka and 135 minutes from Kochi to Osaka, but due to the time-saving effects listed below, the travel time by Shinkansen is expected to be shorter than by air.

Travel time between the four prefectures of Shikoku
Section	Before opening	After opening	Time Saving
Tokushima to Takamatsu	58 min	19 min	39 min
Tokushima to Matsuyama	206 min	61 min	145 min
Tokushima to Kochi	202 min	59 min	143 min
Takamatsu to Matsuyama	142 min	42 min	100 min
Takamatsu to Kochi	132 min	36 min	96 min
Matsuyama to Kochi	247 min	54 min	193 min

Travel time from the four Shikoku prefectures to Okayama Station				Travel time between the four Shikoku prefectures and Shin-Osaka			
Section	Before opening	After opening	Time Saving	Section	Before opening	After opening	Time Saving
Okayama to Takamatsu	54 min	27 min	27 min	Shin-Osaka to Takamatsu	104 min	75 min	29 min
Okayama to Kochi	144 min	43 min	101 min	Shin-Osaka to Kochi	195 min	91 min	104 min
Okayama to Tokushima	119 min	47 min	72 min	Shin-Osaka to Tokushima	173 min	95 min	78 min
Okayama to Matsuyama	160 min	50 min	110 min	Shin-Osaka to Matsuyama	210 min	98 min	112 min

Travel time between the four Shikoku prefectures and Tokyo				Travel time between Shikoku and Tokyo (using the Chūō Shinkansen)			
Section	Before opening	After opening	Time Saving	Section	Before opening	After opening	Time Saving
Tokyo to Takamatsu	263 min	223 min	40 min	Tokyo to Takamatsu	263 min	152 min	111 min
Tokyo to Kochi	353 min	239 min	114 min	Tokyo to Kochi	353 min	168 min	185 min
Tokyo to Tokushima	334 min	243 min	91 min	Tokyo to Tokushima	334 min	172 min	162 min
Tokyo to Matsuyama	368 min	246 min	122 min	Tokyo to Matsuyama	368 min	175 min	193 min

In addition, the following qualitative development effects can be cited :

1. The construction of new tunnels and elevated structures will create a railway network that is more resistant to disasters than conventional lines.
2. In the event of a disaster such as the Nankai Trough earthquake, which is expected to occur in the near future, this will ensure the railway network necessary for evacuation and disaster recovery.
3. In Case 1, it will contribute to the construction of a new Pacific national axis and serve as an alternative line to the Sanyo Shinkansen.
4. Delays in train schedules will be reduced, improving the punctuality and reliability of railways.
5. The line will have a tunnel and elevated structure with no level crossings, reducing accidents and other transport disruptions.
6. This improves ride quality and makes travel more comfortable.
7. The value of the Shinkansen is expected to improve Shikoku's image.
8. It is expected that the population decline trend in areas along the line will be curbed.
9. It will contribute to economic revitalization by opening new offices and commercial facilities.
