= Kii Channel =

Strait connecting the Seto Inland Sea and the Pacific Ocean

- 紀伊水道 (Japanese)
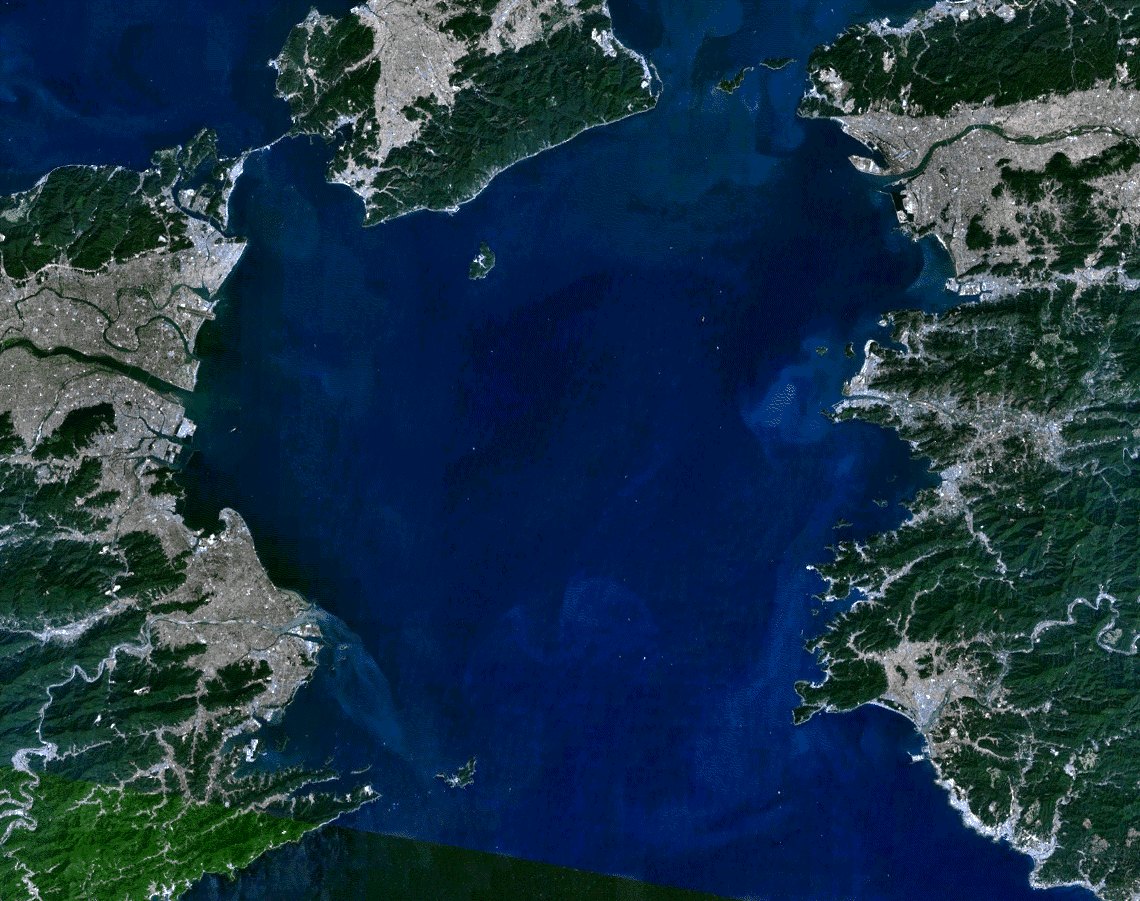
- Landsat 7 view of Kii Channel

- Location in Japan
- Coordinates: 33.9692°N 134.872°E
- Type: strait
- Basin countries: Japan

The Kii Channel (紀伊水道, Kii-suidō), also called the Kii Strait, is a strait separating the Japanese island of Shikoku from the Kii Peninsula on the main island of Honshū. This strait connects the Inland Sea with the Pacific Ocean.

The name of the strait derives from Kii Province, a former province on the Kii Peninsula.

The strait is surrounded by Tokushima Prefecture on Shikoku, Wakayama Prefecture on Honshū, and the southern coast of Awaji Island in Hyōgo Prefecture. It is connected to Osaka Bay via the Kitan Strait and to Harima Nada (the eastern part of the Inland Sea) by the Naruto Strait. Part of the channel is designated as Setonaikai National Park.

Western maps from the 19th century also refer to this waterway as the Linschoten Strait.
