= Price–performance ratio =

Product's capability divided by its cost

In economics, engineering, business management and marketing the price–performance ratio is often written as cost–performance, cost–benefit or capability/price (C/P), refers to a product's ability to deliver performance, of any sort, for its price. Generally speaking, products with a lower price/performance ratio are more desirable on demand curve, excluding other factors.

Even though this term would seem to be a straightforward ratio, when price performance is improved, better, or increased, it actually refers to the performance divided by the price, in other words exactly the opposite ratio (i.e. an inverse ratio) to rank a product as having an increased price/performance.

== Examples ==
=== Consumer and medical products ===
According to futurist Raymond Kurzweil, products start out as highly ineffective and highly expensive.

Gradually, products become more effective and cheaper until they are highly effective and almost free to buy. Some of the products that have followed this example include AIDS medications (which are now affordable compared to initial pricing), text-to-speech programs, and digital cameras. However, products that rely primarily on paper (e.g., newspapers and toilet paper) and/or fossil fuels (e.g., electricity in most countries and petroleum gasoline for automobiles) have only increased in price.

This directly contradicts the trend of electronic gadgets like netbooks, desktop computers, and laptop computers that also have been decreasing in price. However, the prevailing inflation rate of a country or province/state may negate the plummeting costs of software, AIDS medications, and/or digital cameras in certain regions along with certain governmental policies. This has the effect of keeping costs high in certain areas while they are dramatically reduced in others.

In theory, this means that the rich people have earlier access to highly inefficient technologies, medical treatments, and therapies (that are prototypical in nature) while the poor get access to these same products when they become more efficient and easier to manufacture several years down the road.

=== Business world ===
During the latter 1990s, the cost–performance ratios of the larger mainframe systems fell tremendously in comparison to a number of smaller microcomputers handling the same load. As a result, many of the older computer companies were shut down and people were put out of work. However, most of them were able to be re-hired at the newer corporations after undergoing a series of re-training involving the newer technologies.

In the business world, there is usually a value associated with a typical cost–performance ratio analysis. This value can either be positive, neutral, or negative depending on the amount of money spent versus the results achieved by the spending of the available capital. A cost-performance ratio with a positive value (i.e. greater than 1) indicates that costs are running under budget. A negative value (i.e. less than 1) indicates that costs are running over budget. However, a neutral cost-performance ratio (between 1.0 and 1.9) could suggest a certain degree of stagnation in the budget. Business trips can also be factored into the cost–performance ratio because spending $50 to do a journey spanning 100 miles (160 km) in two hours is a better cost–performance ratio than spending $105 to do the journey in one hour.

=== Computer technology ===
The term tends to be used quite a bit when comparing computer hardware. During the latter 1990s, the price–performance ratios of midrange and large mainframe systems fell tremendously in comparison to a number of smaller microcomputers handling the same load. Many companies were forced out of the industry as this happened, including DEC, Data General and many multiprocessor vendors such as Sequent Computer Systems and Pyramid Technology.

== See also ==
- Benefit–cost ratio
