= Takanawa Peninsula =

Peninsula in Ehime Prefecture, Japan

Coordinates: 33°57′0″N 132°55′0″E

The Takanawa Peninsula (Japanese: 高縄半島) is a peninsula in Ehime Prefecture that juts out into the Seto Inland Sea.
