= Kitan Strait =

Strait between Awaji and Honshu islands, Japan

Coordinates: 34.2756°N 135.01047°E

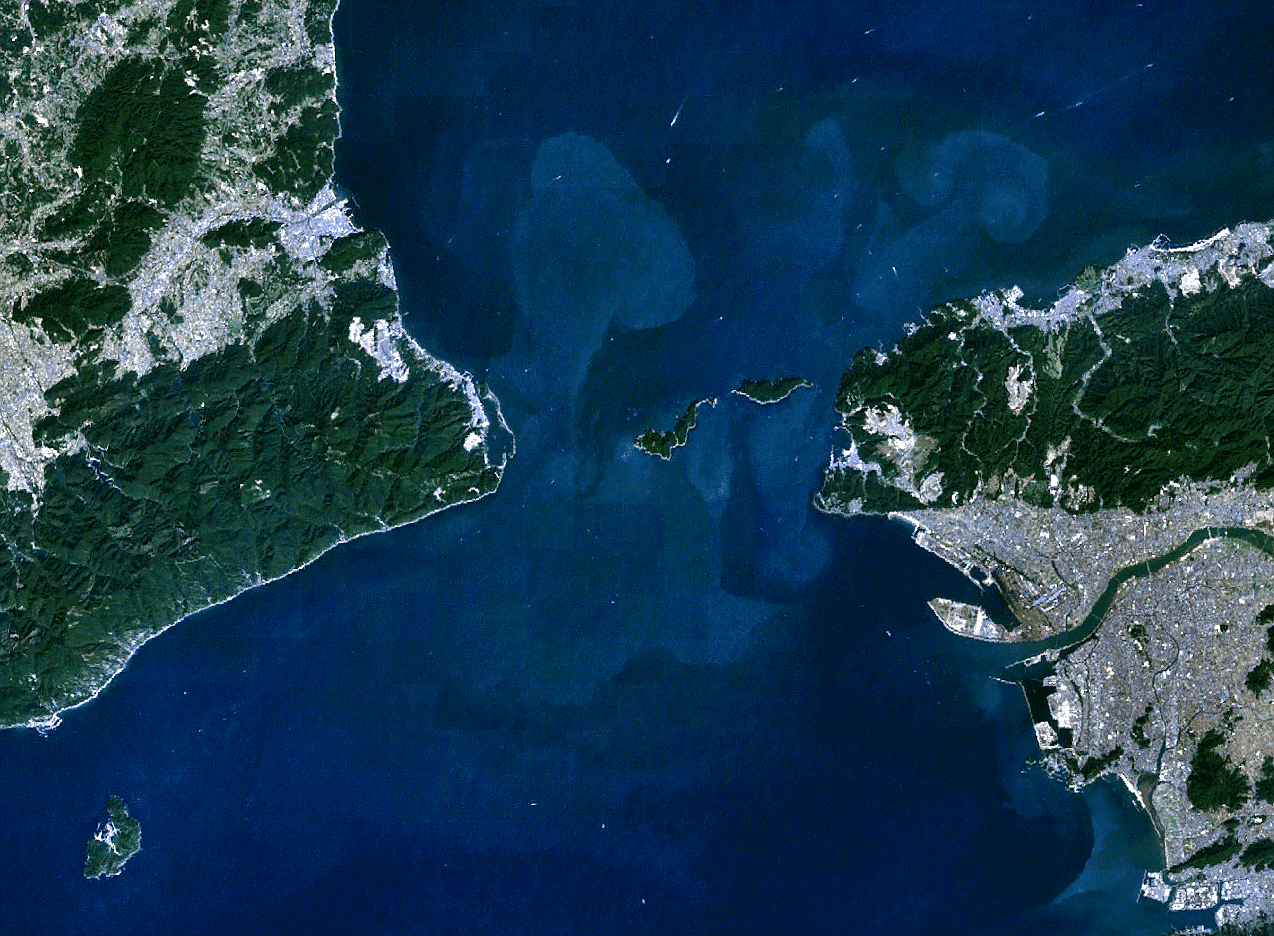
The Kitan Strait, separating Awaji Island from Honshū

The Kitan Strait (紀淡海峡, Kitan kaikyō) or Tomogashima Channel (友ヶ島水道, Tomogashima suidō) separates Awaji Island from Wakayama, Wakayama Prefecture, Japan and connects the Osaka Bay in the north to the Kii Channel in the south. The total width is 11 km, but the islands of Tomogashima reduce the distance to be spanned by a proposed bridge. The strait forms part of the Setonaikai National Park.

== See also ==
- Akashi Strait
