= Shin-Yakumo Station =

Railway station in Yakumo, Japan

Shin-Yakumo Station 新八雲駅

General information
- Location: Yakumo, Futami; Hokkaido Prefecture; Japan
- Coordinates: 42°15′19.2″N 140°13′54.3″E
- Operator: JR Hokkaido
- Line: Hokkaido Shinkansen

History
- Opening: 2038 (scheduled)

Services
Preceding station	JR Hokkaido	Following station
Under Construction
Shin-Hakodate-Hokuto towards Shin-Aomori	Hokkaido Shinkansen Opens in 2038	Oshamambe towards Sapporo
Location
- Location within Hokkaido Location within Japan

Shin-Yakumo Station (新八雲駅, Shin-Yakumo-eki) is a railway station planned to be constructed on the Hokkaido Shinkansen in the town of Yakumo, Hokkaido, Japan. Scheduled to open in 2038, it will be operated by Hokkaido Railway Company (JR Hokkaido).

== Lines ==
Shin-Yakumo Station will be served by the Hokkaido Shinkansen high-speed line, and will be located between Shin-Hakodate-Hokuto and Oshamambe Station. It will be located 3 km west of Yakumo Station.

== See also ==
- List of railway stations in Japan
