= Okutsugaru-Imabetsu Station =

Railway station in Imabetsu, Aomori Prefecture, Japan

Okutsugaru-Imabetsu Station 奥津軽いまべつ駅
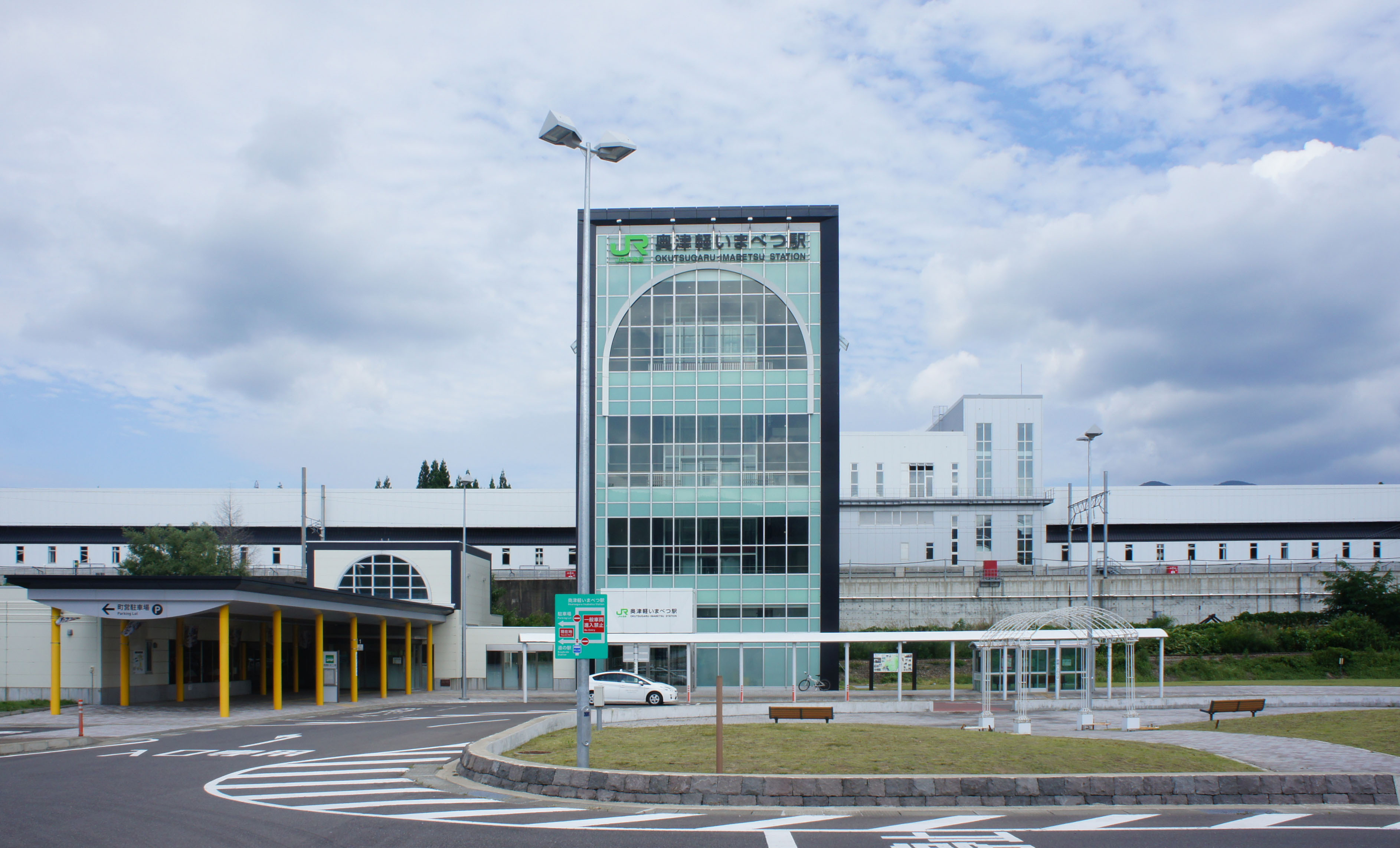
- Okutsugaru-Imabetsu Station, August 2020

General information
- Location: Ōkawadai; Imabetsu, Aomori; Japan
- Coordinates: 41°08′42″N 140°30′56″E
- Operator: JR Hokkaido
- Line: Hokkaido Shinkansen
- Distance: 713.4 km (443.3 mi) from Tokyo
- Platforms: 2 side platforms
- Tracks: 2

Construction
- Structure type: At-grade

History
- Opened: 13 March 1988; 38 years ago
- Rebuilt: 2016
- Former names: Tsugaru-Imabetsu (until 2016)

Services
Preceding station	JR Hokkaido	Following station
Shin-Aomori Terminus	Hokkaido Shinkansen Hayabusa	Kikonai towards Shin-Hakodate-Hokuto
Shin-Aomori Terminus	Hokkaido Shinkansen Hayate	Kikonai towards Shin-Hakodate-Hokuto
Former services
Preceding station	JR Hokkaido	Following station
Tappi-Kaitei towards Hakodate	Tsugaru-Kaikyo Line	Naka-Oguni Terminus
Tappi-Kaitei towards Kikonai	Kaikyo Line	Naka-Oguni Terminus
Location
- Location within Aomori Prefecture Location within Tohoku, Japan Location within Japan

Okutsugaru-Imabetsu Station (Japanese: 奥津軽いまべつ駅, Hepburn: Okutsugaru-Imabetsu-eki) is a railway station on the Hokkaido Shinkansen in the town of Imabetsu in Aomori Prefecture, on the island of Honshu, Japan. It is operated by Hokkaido Railway Company (JR Hokkaido), and is the last stop in Honshu before the Seikan Tunnel to Hokkaido.

== Lines ==
Okutsugaru-Imabetsu Station is served by the Hokkaido Shinkansen between Tokyo or Shin-Aomori and Shin-Hakodate-Hokuto. It used to be served by the Kaikyō Line between Aomori and Hakodate prior to the opening of the Hokkaido Shinkansen. After the beginning of the bullet train services, the Kaikyō Line is normally only used by freight trains.

== Station layout ==
Before the Hokkaido Shinkansen stations were made, Tsugaru-Imabetsu Station had two opposed side platforms serving two tracks. There was no station building, but only a small weather shelter on the platform. The station was unattended.

Although the station is in the middle of the 82 km (51 mi) section shared by the standard-gauge Hokkaido Shinkansen and the-narrow gauge Kaikyō Line, narrow gauge trains use separate tracks (two each) on the both sides of the Shinkansen station so that only bullet trains pass through the passenger platforms.

Okutsugaru-Imabetsu is one of very few stations which is only served by Shinkansen trains, although it is physically connected to Tsugaru-Futamata Station on the JR East Tsugaru Line by an underground passage. However after flood damage on the Tsugaru Line in 2022 resulting in all stations north of Kanita (including Tsugaru-Futamata) being closed, it is now no longer possible to transfer to regular lines.

=== Platforms ===
11	■ Hokkaido Shinkansen	for Shin-Aomori, Sendai, and Tokyo
12	■ Hokkaido Shinkansen	for Kikonai and Shin-Hakodate-Hokuto

== History ==
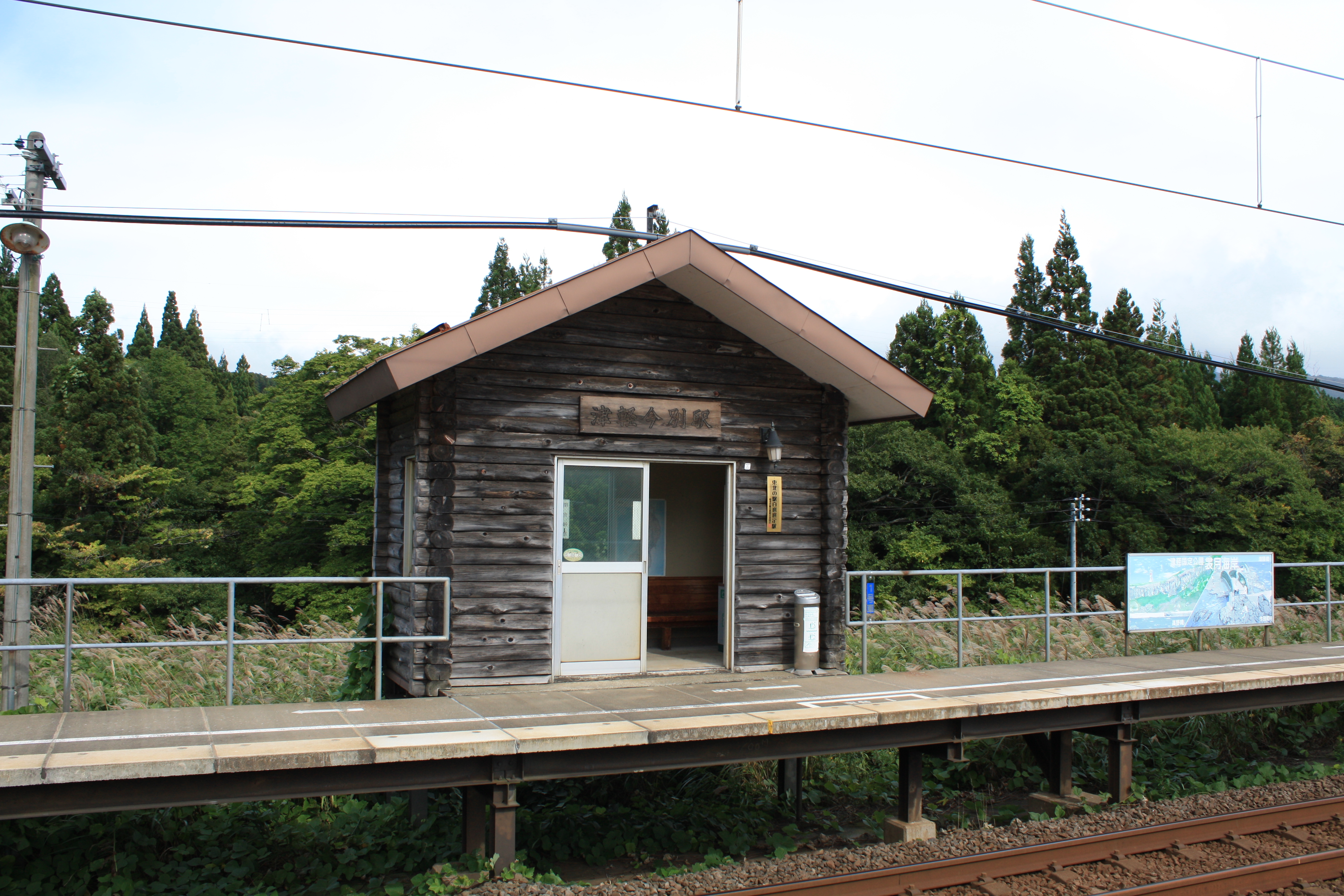
Tsugaru-Imabetsu Station in September 2008

Tsugaru-Imabetsu Station (津軽今別駅, Tsugaru-Imabetsu-eki) on the Kaikyō Line opened on 13 March 1988. From 2002, only the limited express Hakuchō services stopped at this station. According to the 2015 timetable, there were two trains per day in each direction.

The station became a stop on the Hokkaido Shinkansen on 26 March 2016 and was renamed, becoming Okutsugaru-Imabetsu Station. As the work to convert the Tsugaru-Imabetsu Station into the Shinkansen station was in progress, passenger services at the station ceased from 10 August 2015.

== Surrounding area ==
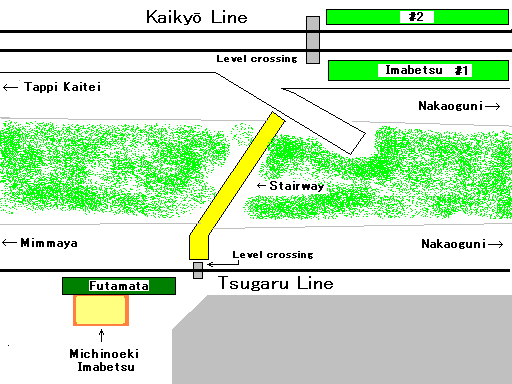
Diagram of Tsugaru-Futamata and Tsugaru-Imabetsu stations

- Tsugaru-Futamata Station on the Tsugaru Line
- Road Station Imabetsu "Asukuru"

== See also ==
- List of railway stations in Japan
