= Mizusawa-Esashi Station =

Railway station in Ōshū, Iwate Prefecture, Japan

Mizusawa-Esashi Station 水沢江刺駅
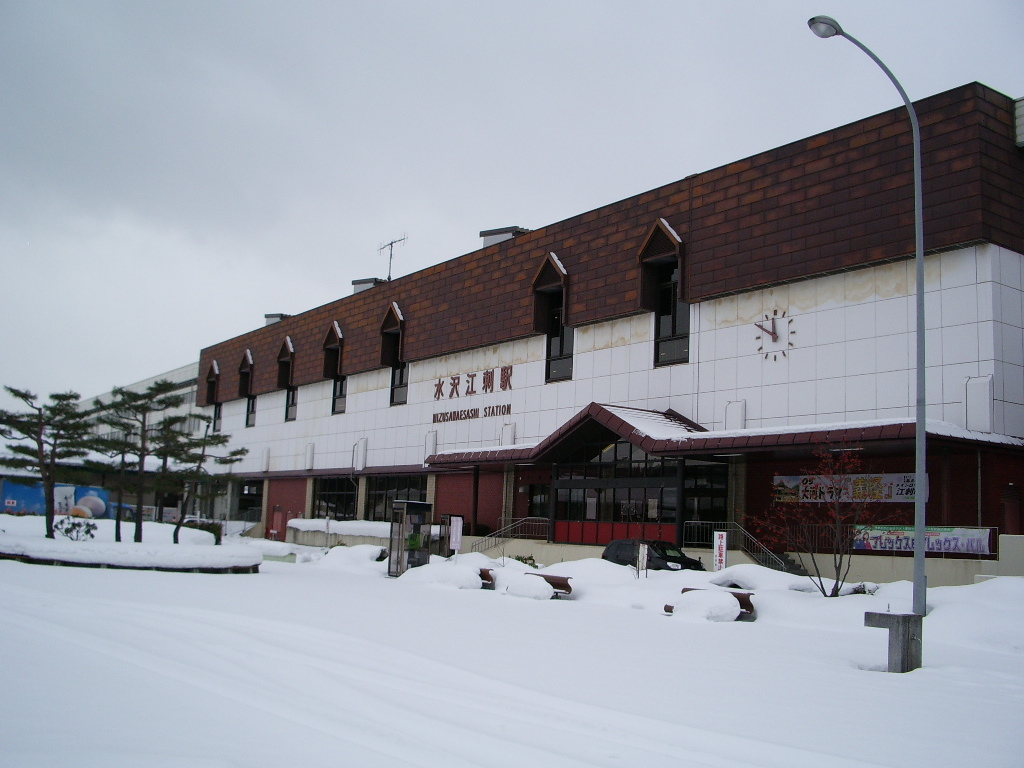
- Mizusawa-Esashi Station in January 2006

Japanese name
- Shinjitai: 水沢江刺駅
- Kyūjitai: 水澤江刺驛
- Hiragana: みずさわえさしえき

General information
- Location: Mizusawa-ku 1-185 Hadacho-emikae, Ōshū City, Iwate Prefecture 023-0132; Japan
- Coordinates: 39.145339°N 141.188693°E
- Operator: JR East
- Line: Tōhoku Shinkansen
- Distance: 470.1 km (292.1 mi) from Tokyo
- Platforms: 2 side platforms
- Tracks: 2

Construction
- Structure type: Elevated

Other information
- Status: Staffed (Midori no Madoguchi)
- Website: Official website

History
- Opened: March 14, 1985; 41 years ago

Passengers
- FY2018: 1,003 daily

Services
Preceding station	JR East	Following station
Ichinoseki towards Tokyo	Tōhoku Shinkansen Hayabusa	Kitakami towards Shin-Aomori
Ichinoseki towards Tokyo	Tōhoku Shinkansen Yamabiko	Kitakami towards Morioka
Location
- Location within Iwate Prefecture Location within Tohoku, Japan Location within Japan

Mizusawa-Esashi Station (水沢江刺駅, Mizusawa-Esashi-eki) is a railway station in the city of Ōshū, Iwate, Japan, operated by the East Japan Railway Company (JR East).

== Lines ==
Mizusawa-Esashi Station is served by the Tohoku Shinkansen from Tokyo to Shin-Aomori. It is 470.1 kilometers from the starting point of the Tohoku Shinkansen at Tokyo Station.

== Station layout ==
The station has two elevated opposed side platforms with chest-high platform edge doors. The station has a Midori no Madoguchi staffed ticket office.

=== Platforms ===
1	Tōhoku Shinkansen	for Morioka, Shin-Aomori and Akita
2	Tōhoku Shinkansen	for Sendai, Utsunomiya, Ōmiya, and Tokyo

== History ==
Mizusawa-Esashi Station opened on March 14, 1985, three years after the opening of the Tōhoku Shinkansen.

== Passenger statistics ==
In fiscal 2018, the station was used by an average of 1,003 passengers daily (boarding passengers only).

== Surrounding area ==
- Kitakami River
- National Route 397
- National Route 456
- Mizusawa Racecourse

== See also ==
- List of railway stations in Japan
