= Shichinohe-Towada Station =

Railway station in Shichinohe, Aomori Prefecture, Japan

Coordinates: 40°43′11″N 141°09′16″E

Shichinohe-Towada Station 七戸十和田駅
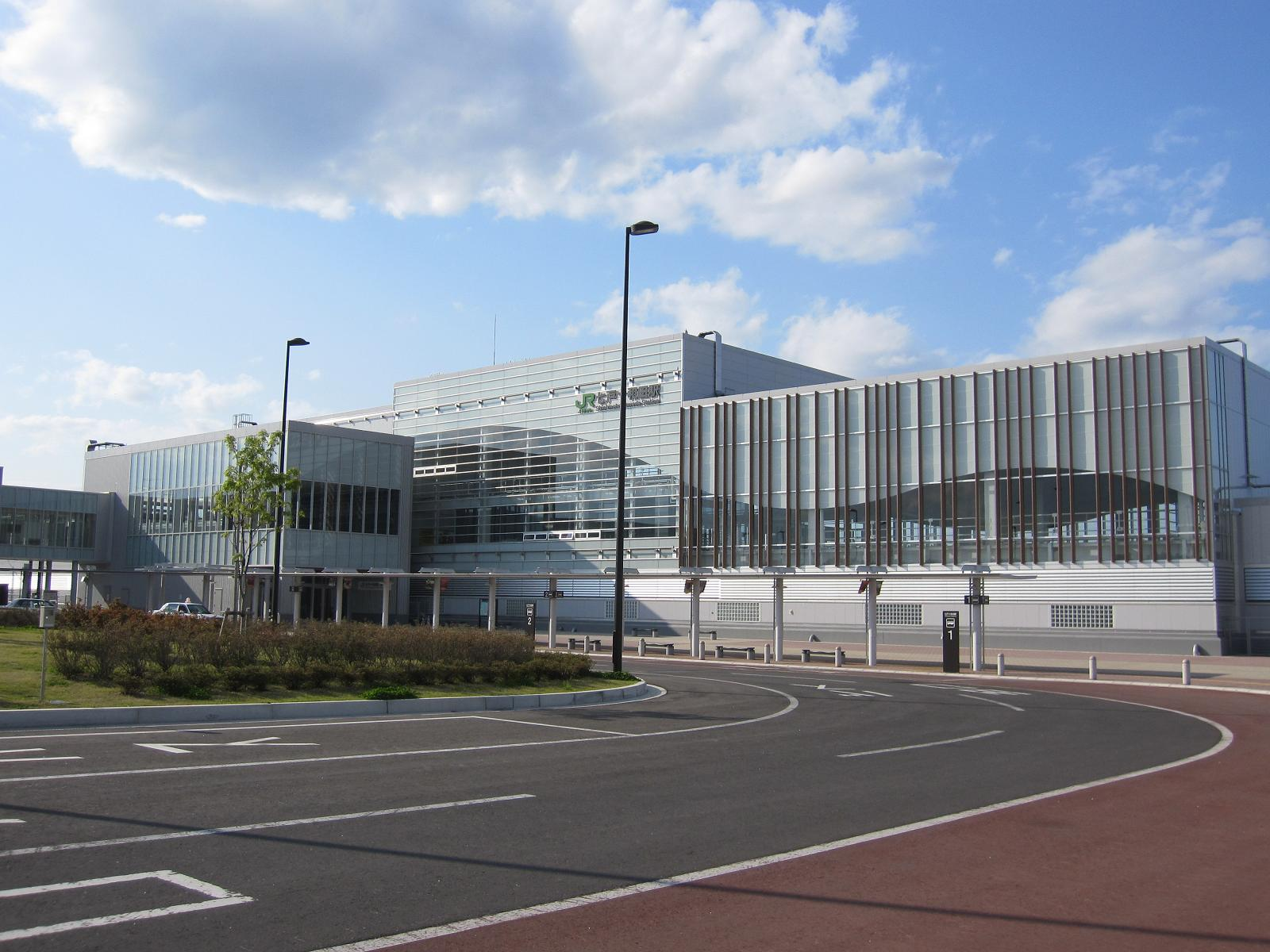
- Shichinohe-Towada Station in May 2011

General information
- Location: Arakumanai, Shichinohe, Kamikita District, Aomori; Japan
- Operator: JR East
- Line: Tōhoku Shinkansen
- Platforms: 2 side platforms
- Tracks: 2

Construction
- Structure type: At grade

History
- Opened: 4 December 2010; 15 years ago

Passengers
- FY2011: 497 daily

Services
Preceding station	JR East	Following station
Hachinohe towards Tokyo	Tōhoku Shinkansen Hayabusa	Shin-Aomori Terminus
Hachinohe towards Morioka	Tōhoku Shinkansen Hayate	Shin-Aomori Terminus
Location
- Location within Japan

Shichinohe-Towada Station (七戸十和田駅, Shichinohe-Towada-eki) is a railway station on the Tohoku Shinkansen in Shichinohe, Aomori, Japan, operated by the East Japan Railway Company (JR East). It opened on 4 December 2010.

== Lines ==
Shichinohe-Towada Station is served by the Tohoku Shinkansen high-speed line from Tokyo to Shin-Aomori.

== Station layout ==
The station consists of two side platforms serving two tracks, with no passing tracks. The platforms are 263 m long and capable of handling 10-car trains. A track maintenance depot is located north of the station, with the connecting turnouts covered by a large snow shelter.

=== Platforms ===
1	■ Tohoku Shinkansen	for Shin-Aomori
2	■ Tohoku Shinkansen	for Morioka, Sendai, and Tokyo

Some trains pass this station.

== History ==
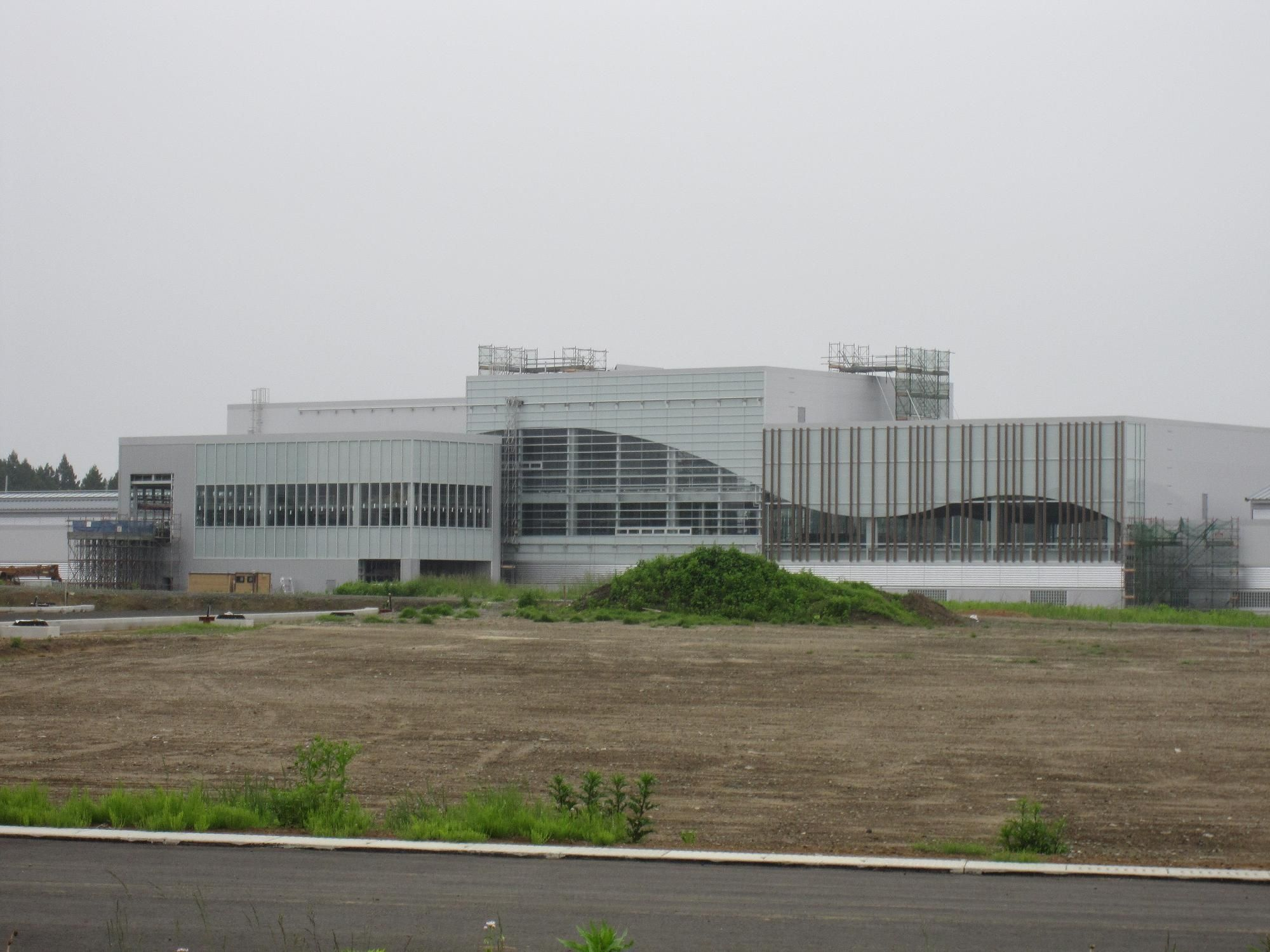
The station under construction in June 2009

Construction of the new station started in August 2008, with completion scheduled for September 2009. The station opened on 4 December 2010 with the opening of the Tohoku Shinkansen extension from Hachinohe to Shin-Aomori.

Initially named provisionally as Shichinohe Station, the name of the new station was announced on 29 July 2009, to emphasize the station's role as a gateway to Lake Towada.

== Passenger statistics ==
In fiscal 2011, the station was used by an average of 497 passengers daily (boarding passengers only).

The passenger figures for previous years are as shown below.

Fiscal year	Daily average
2010	475
2011	497

== Bus terminal ==
=== Highway buses ===
- Sirius; For Ikebukuro Station and Tokyo Station
- Enburi; For Shinjuku Station and Tokyo Station

== See also ==
- List of railway stations in Japan
