= Shin-Hakodate-Hokuto Station =

Railway station in Hokuto, Hokkaido, Japan

H70 Shin-Hakodate-Hokuto Station 新函館北斗駅
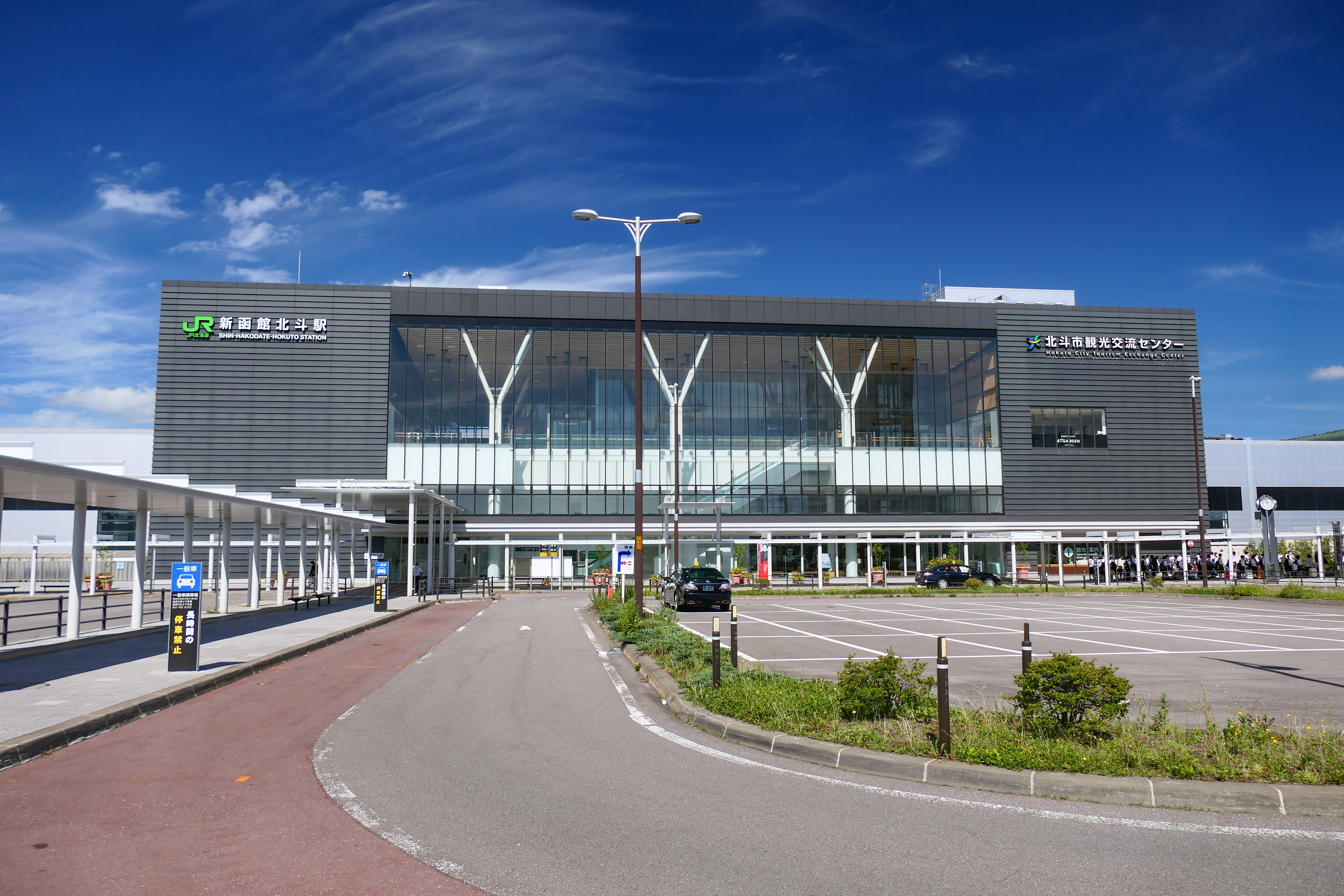
- Shin-Hakodate-Hokuto Station in September 2022

General information
- Location: 1-1-1 Ichido; Hokuto, Hokkaido; Japan
- Coordinates: 41°54′19″N 140°38′47″E
- Operator: JR Hokkaido
- Lines: Hokkaido Shinkansen; Hakodate Main Line
- Distance: 823.7 km (511.8 mi) from Tokyo
- Platforms: 2 side platforms (Hokkaido Shinkansen); 1 island and 1 side platform (local trains); 1 bay platform (Hakodate Liner)
- Connections: Bus stop

Construction
- Structure type: At-grade

Other information
- Station code: H70

History
- Opened: 10 December 1902; 123 years ago
- Rebuilt: 2016
- Former names: Hongō (1902–1942); Oshima-Ōno (1942–2016)

Services
Preceding station	JR Hokkaido	Following station
Kikonai towards Shin-Aomori	Hokkaido Shinkansen Hayabusa	Terminus
Kikonai towards Shin-Aomori	Hokkaido Shinkansen Hayate	Terminus
Goryōkaku H74 towards Hakodate	Hokuto	Ōnuma-Kōen H67 towards Sapporo
Goryokaku H74 towards Hakodate	Hakodate Main Line Rapid Hakodate Liner	Terminus
Nanae H71 towards Hakodate	Hakodate Main Line Local	Ōnuma H68 towards Asahikawa

Future services
Preceding station	JR Hokkaido	Following station
Kikonai towards Shin-Aomori	Hokkaido Shinkansen Opens 2038	Shin-Yakumo towards Sapporo
Location
- Location within Hokkaido Location within Japan

Shin-Hakodate-Hokuto Station (Japanese: 新函館北斗駅, Hepburn: Shin-Hakodate-Hokuto-eki; lit. 'New Hakodate-Hokuto Station') is a railway station on the Hakodate Main Line in Hokuto, Hokkaido, Japan, operated by the Hokkaido Railway Company (JR Hokkaido). The station – rebuilt and very extensively enlarged to serve from March 2016 as the northern terminal of the new Hokkaido Shinkansen – occupies the site of the former Oshima-Ōno Station (渡島大野駅), and is currently the northernmost high-speed Shinkansen railway station in Japan.

== Lines ==
The station, which is numbered H70, is served by trains operating on the Hakodate Main Line and the Hokkaido Shinkansen, opened in 2016.

== Station layout ==
Shin-Hakodate-Hokuto Station has two platforms serving four tracks on the ground level for the Hakodate Main line, and two side platforms serving two tracks on the upper level for the Hokkaido Shinkansen.

Platform No	Direction	Notes
Hakodate Main Line – Ground level
1	for Hakodate	Used by the Rapid Hakodate Liner service
2	for Hakodate	Used by Limited Express services
2	for Mori・Oshamambe・Higashi-Muroran・Tomakomai・Sapporo	Used by Limited Express and local services
3	for Mori・Oshamambe・Higashi-Muroran・Tomakomai・Sapporo	Used by Limited Express services
3	for Hakodate	Used by local services
4	Usually not used	
Hokkaido Shinkansen – Upper level
11	for Shin Aomori・Morioka・Sendai・Tokyo	
12	For Sapporo (Opening 2038)	

== History ==
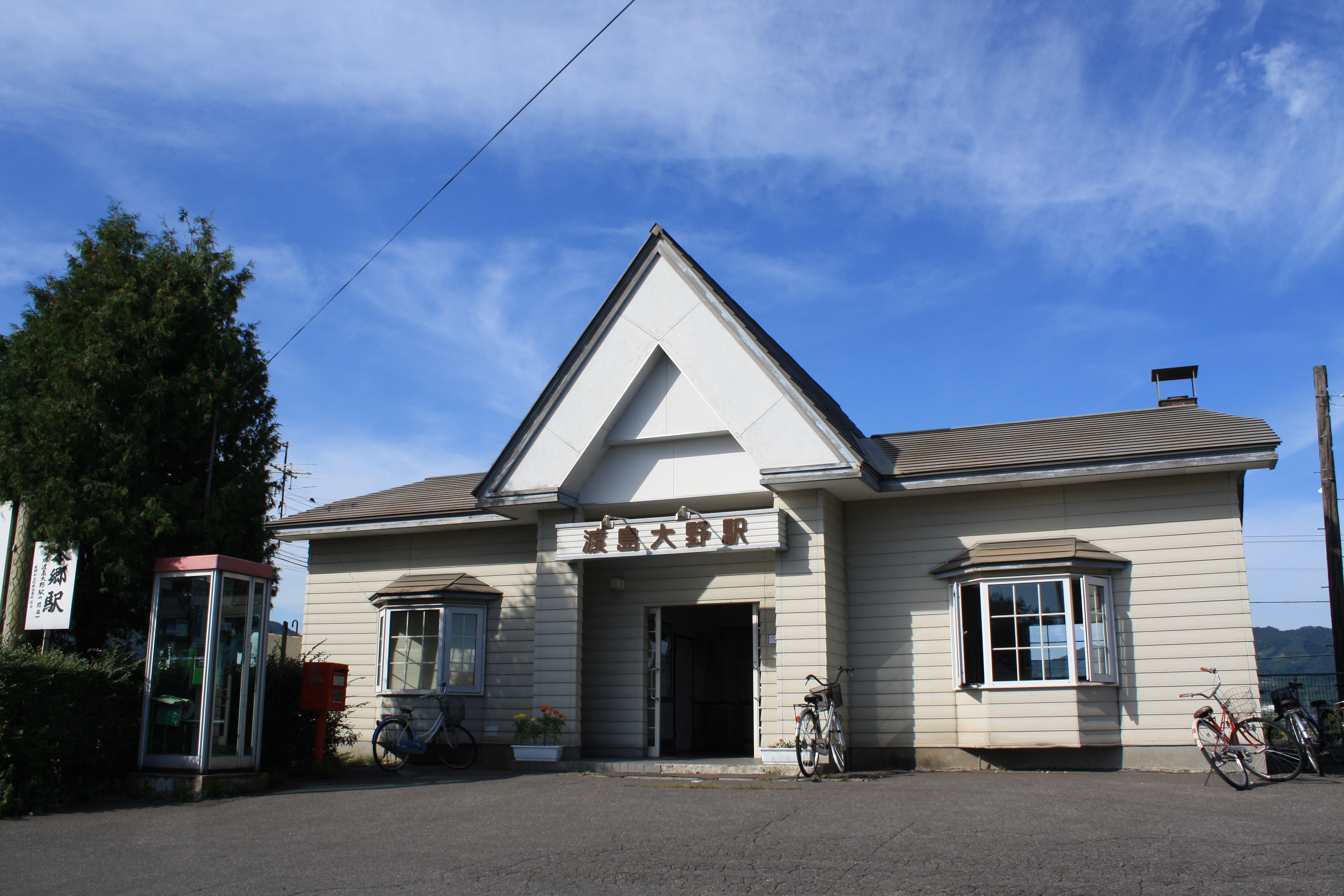
Old station building in 2008

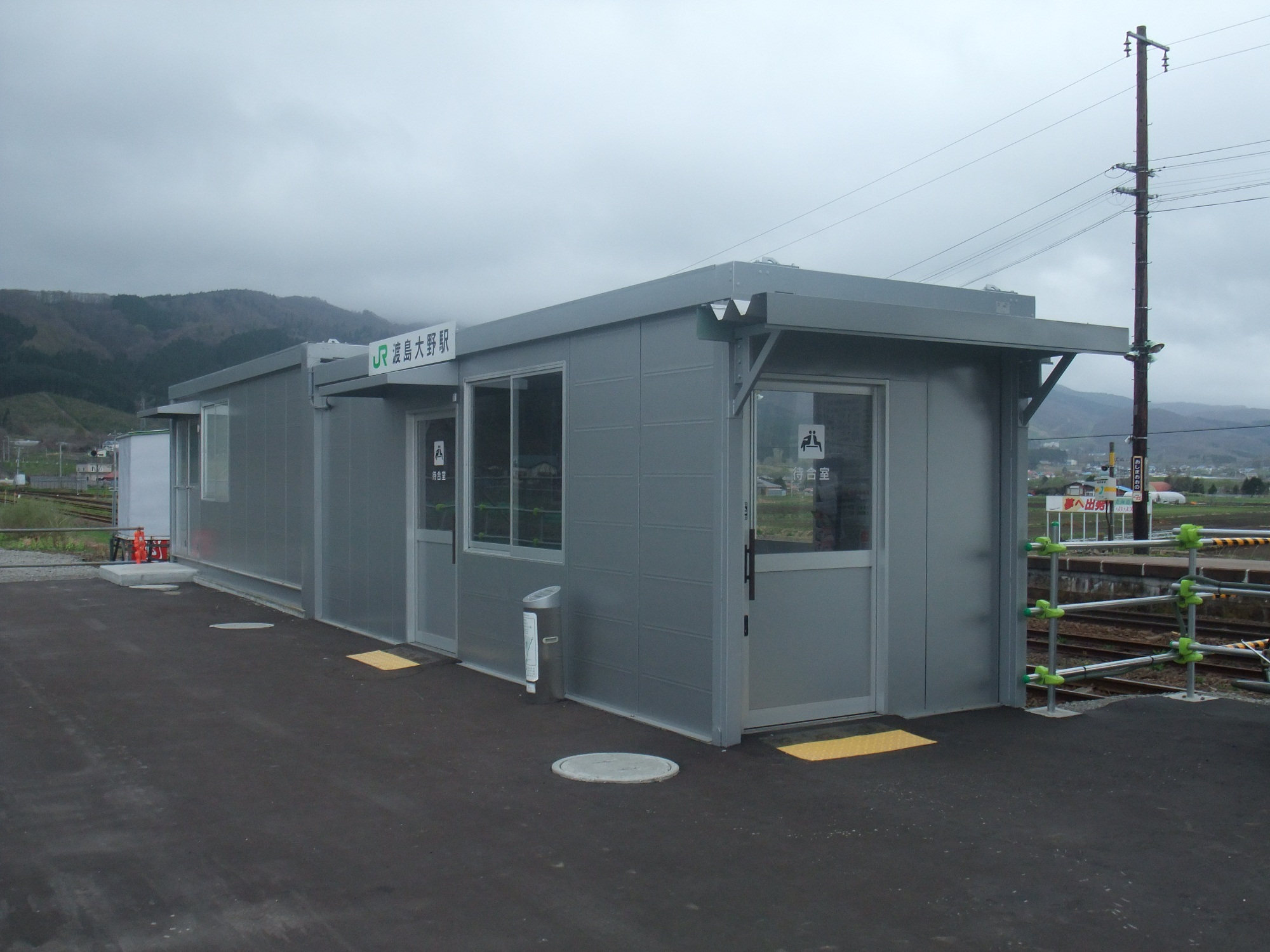
Temporary station building

The station opened on 10 December 1902, named Hongō Station (本郷駅). It was renamed Oshima-Ono on 1 April 1942. With the privatization of JNR on 1 April 1987, the station came under the control of JR Hokkaido.

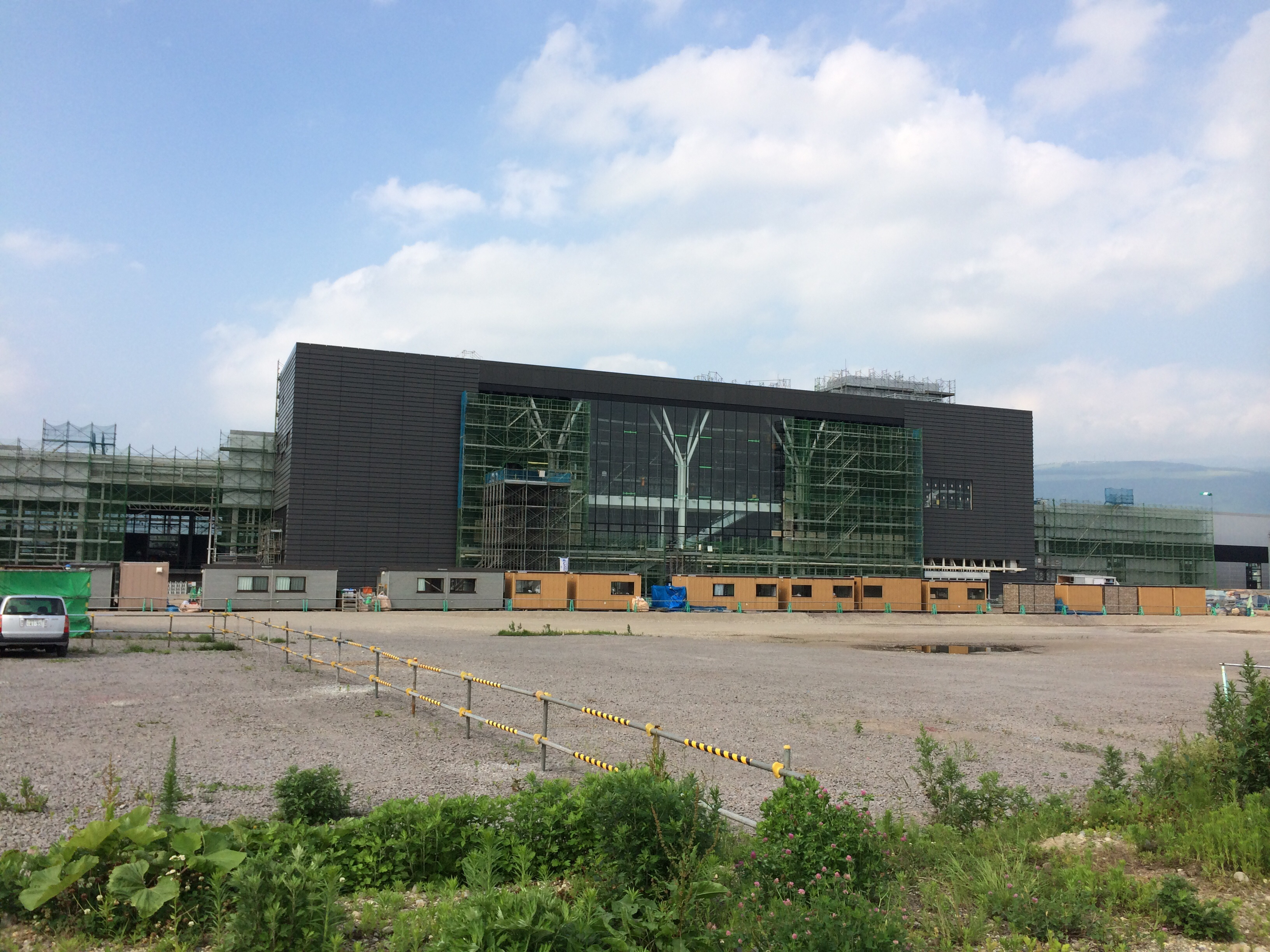
Shin-Hakodate-Hokuto station under construction, July 2014

The station has been rebuilt and renamed Shin-Hakodate-Hokuto Station (新函館北斗駅), becoming a stop on the Hokkaido Shinkansen high-speed line, which opened on 26 March 2016. "Relay" shuttle services using three-car 733 series electric trains operate to and from the centrally located Hakodate Station (approximately 18 km away).

The rebuilt station features large windows and white support pillars modeled after poplar trees near the local Trappist monastery. Ticket vending machines are located on the second floor of the structure. The inside uses a large number of locally sourced cedar lumber and Hokkaido bricks.

Since the construction of the new station, the immediate surrounding areas have been redeveloped significantly with new roads, homes and businesses.

The Hokkaido Shinkansen, connecting Honshu, Japan's main island, to the northern island of Hokkaido commenced service on 26 March 2016. Due to the line's extension to Sapporo (under construction), the Oshima-Ōno Station at Hokuto, Hokkaido, has been upgraded into the "New Hakodate-Hokuto Station," and received a bronze Fist of the North Star statue.

== Future ==
The extension of the Hokkaido Shinkansen to Sapporo is scheduled to commence operation in 2038.

== See also ==
- List of railway stations in Japan
