= Hokkaido Shinkansen =

High-speed rail line in Hokkaido and Aomori Prefecture, Japan

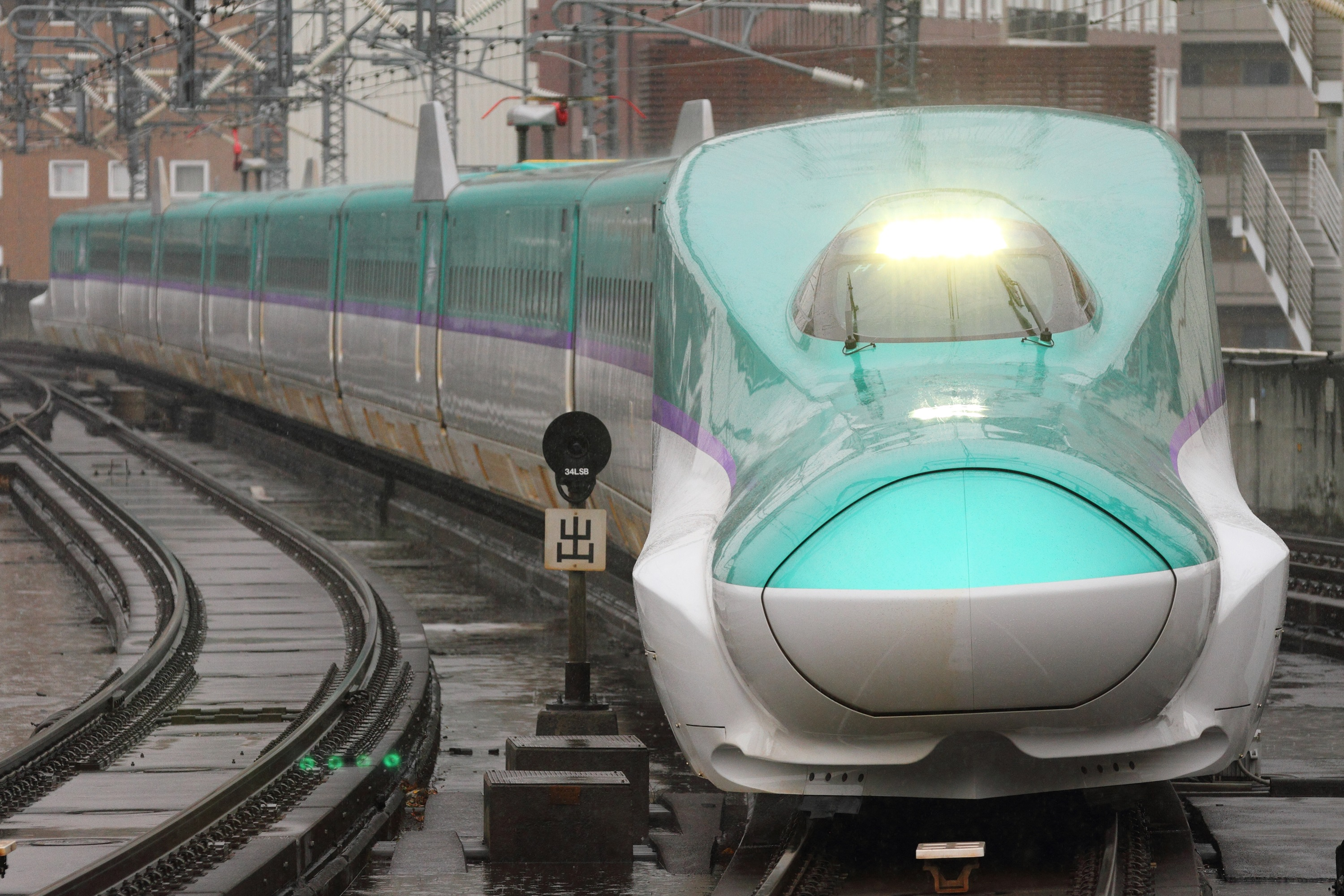
- An H5 series Shinkansen

Overview
- Native name: 北海道新幹線
- Owner: JRTT
- Locale: Aomori Prefecture and Hokkaido, Japan
- Termini: Shin-Aomori; Shin-Hakodate-Hokuto
- Stations: 4
- Color on map: (Grass)

Service
- Type: High-speed rail (Shinkansen)
- System: Shinkansen
- Services: Hayabusa; Hayate
- Operator: JR Hokkaido
- Rolling stock: E5/H5
- Ridership: 2.11 million (JFY 2016)

History
- Opened: 26 March 2016; 10 years ago

Technical
- Line length: 148.8 km (92.5 mi); 360.6 km (224.1 mi) (2038)
- Num of tracks: 2
- Track gauge: 1,435 mm (4 ft 8 1/2 in) standard gauge
- Minimum radius: 4,000 m (2.5 mi; 13,000 ft)
- Electrification: Overhead line, 25 kV 50 Hz AC
- Operating speed: 260 km/h (162 mph) (Note: Speed restricted to 160 km/h (99 mph) through the Seikan Tunnel, except during holiday periods.)
- Signalling: Cab signalling
- Train protection system: DS-ATC
- Maximum incline: 2.08% (current); 3.0% (under construction)
Route map
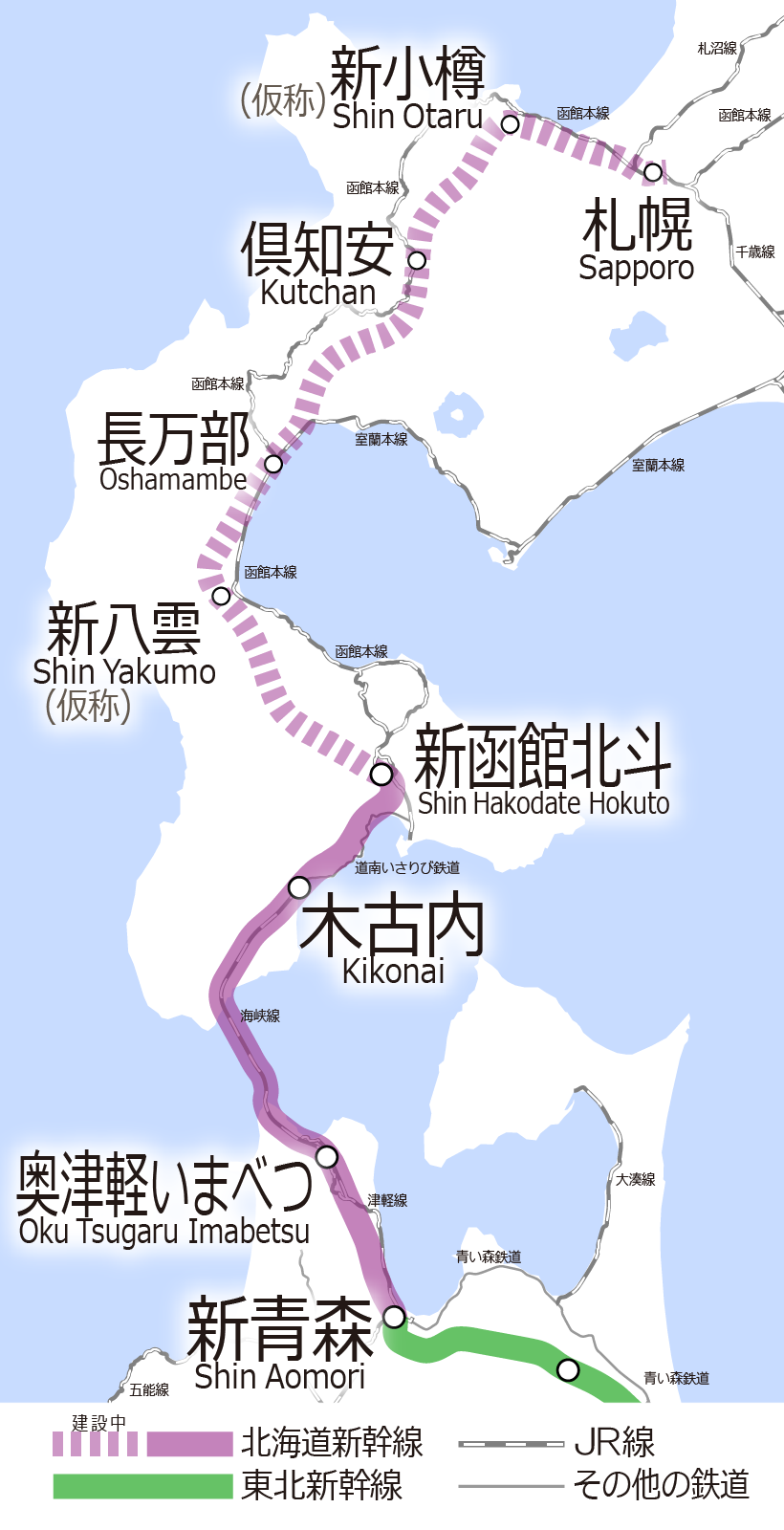

The Hokkaido Shinkansen (Japanese: 北海道新幹線, Hepburn: Hokkaidō Shinkansen) is a Japanese high-speed Shinkansen rail line operated by the Hokkaido Railway Company (JR Hokkaido) which connects with the Tōhoku Shinkansen in northern Aomori Prefecture on Honshu and extends into Hokkaido through the undersea Seikan Tunnel. The line is 148.8 kilometres (92.5 mi) long and has a maximum operating speed of 260 kilometres per hour (160 mph). Construction began in May 2005, and the initial section between Shin-Aomori and Shin-Hakodate-Hokuto opened on 26 March 2016.

An extension north to Sapporo, which will add 211.8 kilometres (131.6 mi) of new line, was originally scheduled to open by fiscal year 2030, but in December 2024 the opening was revised to the end of FY2038.

== Associated actions ==
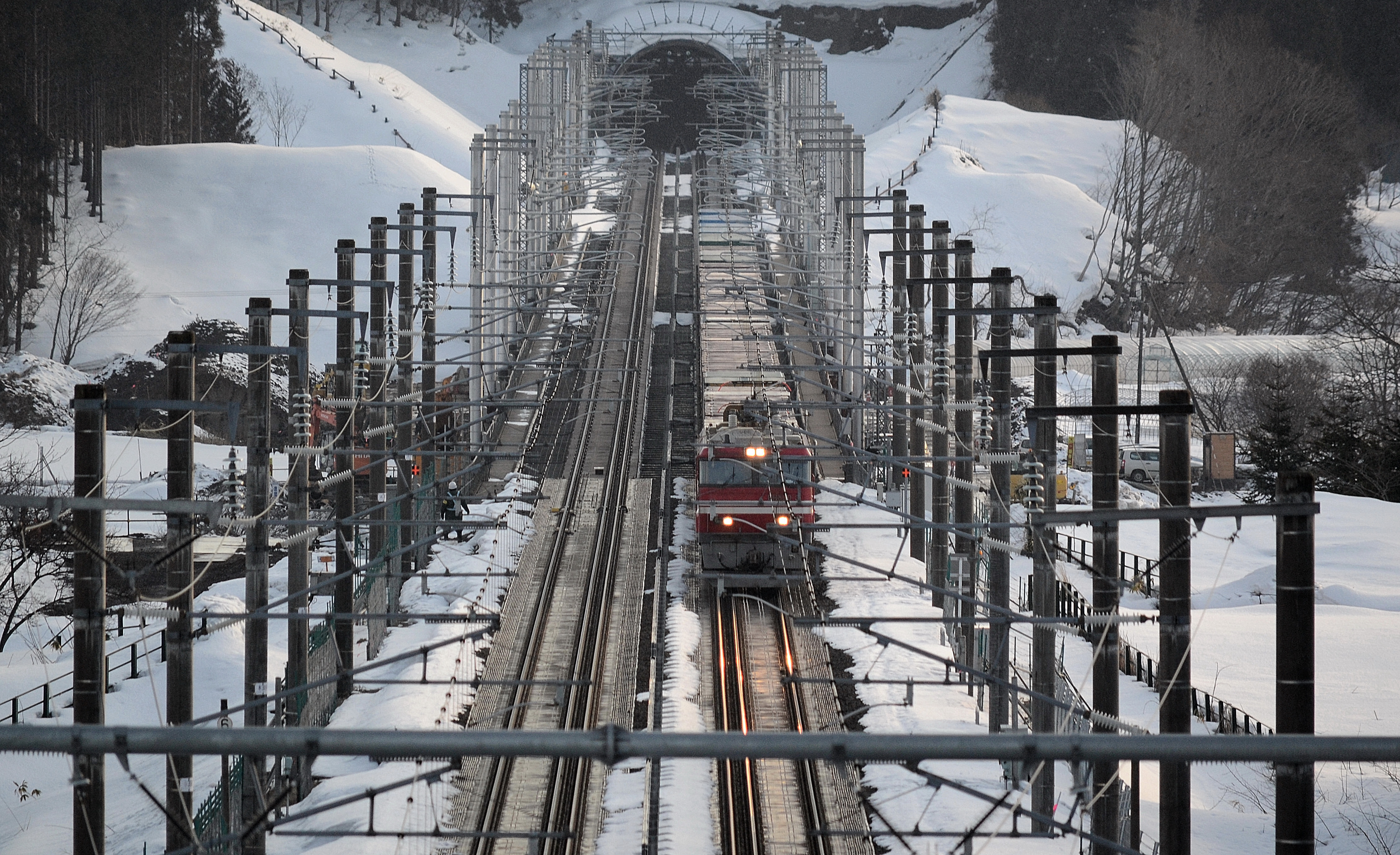
The dual-gauge Kaikyo Line near Kikonai Station in March 2016

In preparation for the opening of the Hokkaido Shinkansen, the Seikan Tunnel (Kaikyō Line) and its approaches, totaling approximately 82 km (51 mi), were converted to dual gauge, accommodating both the Shinkansen's 1,435 mm (4 ft 8 1/2 in) standard-gauge and conventional 1,067 mm (3 ft 6 in) narrow gauge tracks.

With the opening of the Shinkansen line, the parallel narrow-gauge Esashi Line between Goryōkaku and Kikonai was transferred from JR Hokkaido to a newly established third-sector operator, the South Hokkaido Railway Company, and rebranded as the Isaribi Line.

== Operations ==
=== Service types ===
Two types of Shinkansen services operate on the Hokkaido Shinkansen: express Hayabusa services between Shin-Hakodate-Hokuto and Shin-Aomori, with through services continuing to Tokyo or Sendai via the Tōhoku Shinkansen, and local Hayate services operating between Shin-Hakodate-Hokuto and Shin-Aomori, with some trains continuing to Morioka via the Tōhoku Shinkansen.

Under the initial timetable, ten daily round-trip Hayabusa services operate between Tokyo and Shin-Hakodate-Hokuto, along with one daily round trip between Sendai and Shin-Hakodate-Hokuto. Hayate services include one daily round trip each between Morioka and Shin-Hakodate-Hokuto, and between Shin-Aomori and Shin-Hakodate-Hokuto.

=== Operating speed ===
Upon commencement of services in 2016, the maximum speed on the approximately 82-kilometre (51 mi) dual-gauge section approaching and through the Seikan Tunnel was limited to 140 kilometres per hour (87 mph), later increased to 160 kilometres per hour (99 mph) in March 2019. This restriction is necessary because the shock wave from a Shinkansen train traveling at full speed could destabilize a narrow-gauge freight train travelling in the opposite direction. Approximately 50 freight trains use the dual-gauge section each day, so operations cannot be limited to times outside Shinkansen services. Because of this restriction, the fastest journey time between Tokyo and Shin-Hakodate-Hokuto is currently 3 hours, 57 minutes.

During holiday periods, when freight traffic is reduced and passenger demand increases, the maximum speed on the dual-gauge section is raised. This scheme was first implemented during the 2020–21 New Year holiday and the Golden Week period from 3–6 May 2021, when speeds were increased to 210 kilometres per hour (130 mph), and continued until January 2024, when JR Hokkaido announced that speeds would be raised to 260 kilometres per hour (160 mph) during major holiday periods.

To operate Shinkansen trains at 260 kilometres per hour (160 mph) through the dual-gauge section, proposals include a system to automatically reduce speed when passing narrow-gauge trains and loading freight trains onto specially designed "train on train" standard-gauge vehicles capable of withstanding the shock waves from passing Shinkansen trains. If such a train on train system is implemented, it could reduce travel times by 12 minutes.

== Effects of winter weather on train operation ==
Operating in areas that see significant snowfall during the winter months, accumulation of snow has effects on various train operations. It can cause damage to equipment or can cause a moving train to miss a switch. In particular, accretion of snow in the bogies of the train has been shown to be significant, causing damage or causing schedule delays. Methods have been used to estimate snow accumulation on trains running up to 130 km/h (81 mph), and newer estimates based on weather data can predict accumulation of up to 3 cm (1.2 in) in bogies upon arrival at a station.

The winter season also adversely impacts the occupancy rates of the rail line, with recorded occupancy reaching a low of 19% in the months of January and February.

== Stations ==
Legend:

●	All trains stop
▲	Some trains stop

Station	Distance in km (mi) from		Service		Transfers	Location	
Station	Shin-Aomori	Tokyo	Hayabusa	Hayate	Transfers	Location	
↑ Through services to/from Tokyo via the Tōhoku Shinkansen ↑
Shin-Aomori 新青森	0 (0)	674.9 (419.4)	●	●	Tōhoku Shinkansen (through service); Ōu Main Line	Aomori	Aomori
Okutsugaru-Imabetsu 奥津軽いまべつ	38.5 (23.9)	713.4 (443.3)	▲	●		Imabetsu	Aomori
Seikan Tunnel
Kikonai 木古内	113.3 (70.4)	788.2 (489.8)	▲	●	South Hokkaido Railway	Kikonai	Hokkaido
Shin-Hakodate-Hokuto 新函館北斗	148.8 (92.5)	823.7 (511.8)	●	●	Hakodate Main Line	Hokuto	Hokkaido
↓ Under construction ↓
Shin-Yakumo (Note: Tentative name) 新八雲	203.0 (126.1)	877.9 (545.5)				Yakumo	Hokkaido
Oshamambe 長万部	235.9 (146.6)	910.8 (565.9)			Hakodate Main Line; Muroran Main Line	Oshamambe	Hokkaido
Kutchan 倶知安	290.3 (180.4)	965.2 (599.7)			Hakodate Main Line	Kutchan	Hokkaido
Shin-Otaru 新小樽	328.3 (204.0)	1,003.2 (623.4)				Otaru	Hokkaido
Sapporo 札幌	360.6 (224.1)	1,035.5 (643.4)			Hakodate Main Line; Chitose Line; Sasshō Line; Namboku Line; Tōhō Line	Kita-ku, Sapporo	Hokkaido

== Rolling stock ==
All services are formed of 10-car JR East E5 or JR Hokkaido H5 series trainsets.

In February 2014, JR Hokkaido placed an order for four 10-car H5 Series Shinkansen trainsets for use on Hokkaido Shinkansen services from March 2016. Based on the E5 series trainsets operated by JR East since 2011, the order for 40 vehicles cost approximately 18 billion yen. The first two sets of the order are scheduled to be delivered to Hakodate Depot by road from Hakodate Port in October 2014, with test running commencing before the end of the year. The remaining two sets on order were scheduled to be delivered in 2015. The vehicles feature the usual upper green and lower white livery, with a purple stripe in the middle. The color purple was chosen to represent the purple flowers of Hokkaido: lilacs, lupine and lavender. Inside, the ordinary-class cars feature wood paneling and carpet with a snowflake motif. Green class features cream-colored walls representing the local dairy industry and carpet with a drift-ice motif. Gran class features dark blue carpets, said to be modeled after the shimmering lakes and bodies of water along the route.

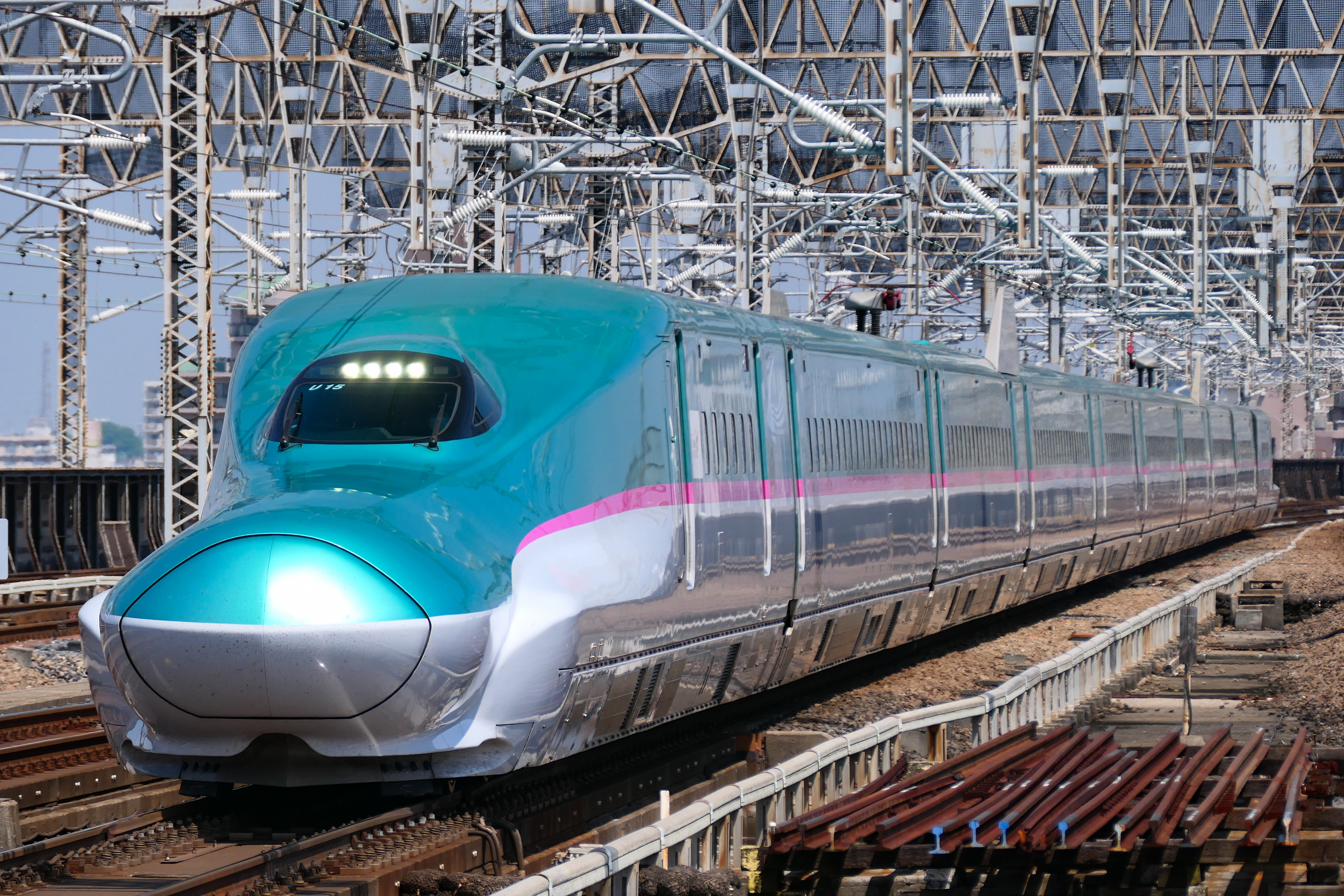
A JR East E5 series train in May 2022

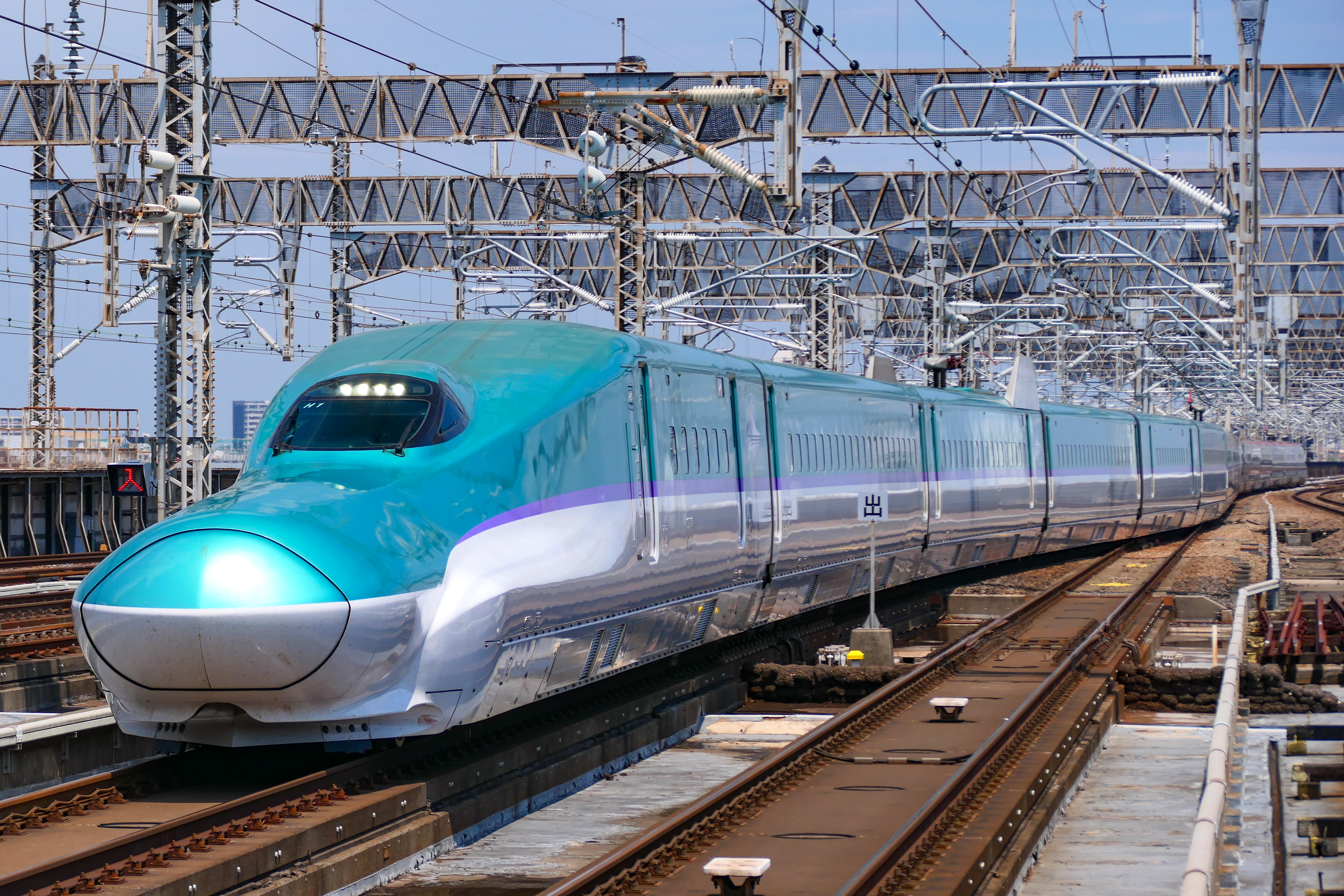
A JR Hokkaido H5 series train in June 2022

=== Non-revenue-earning types ===
- East i (E926)

== History ==
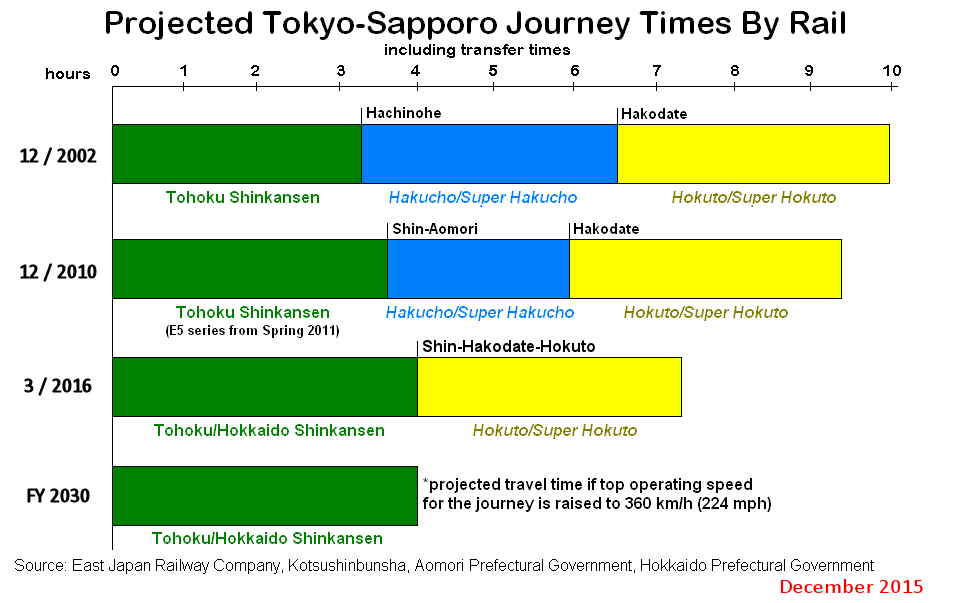
A chart showing proposed journey times between Tokyo and Sapporo as the Hokkaido Shinkansen is extended.

In the early 1970s, two other Shinkansen routes were proposed for Hokkaido: Sapporo – Asahikawa (Hokkaido Shinkansen extension) and Oshamambe – Muroran – Sapporo (Hokkaido South Route). There were also further unofficial plans to connect to Abashiri, Kushiro and Nayoro/Wakkanai. These plans have been indefinitely shelved.

Hokkaido along with Shikoku was, prior to the opening of the line, the only of the four main islands of Japan without a Shinkansen connection. Similarly, JR Hokkaido and JR Shikoku along with JR Freight are the only parts of JR Group that have yet to undergo privatization. In 2024, the air route between Sapporo and Tokyo was the second busiest in the world by passenger numbers. A faster train connection would shift some of those passengers from air to rail as happened when other Shinkansen services were inaugurated.

On 1 November 2014, a ceremony was held at Kikonai Station to mark the completion of track-laying for the line between Shin-Aomori and Shin-Hakodate-Hokuto. Test-running on the Hokkaido Shinkansen tracks within Hokkaido commenced from 1 December 2014, initially at low speeds, with the speed raised to the maximum of 260 km/h (160 mph) later that month. Test-running was extended through the Seikan Tunnel to Okutsugaru-Imabetsu in December 2014. Test-running south of Okutsugaru-Imabetsu commenced on 21 April 2015, with the first train reaching Shin-Aomori Station from the north in the early hours of 24 May.

== Sapporo extension ==
JR Hokkaido is extending the Hokkaido Shinkansen from Shin-Hakodate-Hokuto to Sapporo, originally planned to open by 2030. However, in May 2024, the JRTT reported to the MLIT that it would be 'extremely difficult' to extend the line to Sapporo by 2030. In December 2024, MLIT announced the opening will be delayed until FY2038. There is potential for the opening date to be revised in either direction, and a further announcement will be made after discussions at a panel of experts which will commence in January 2025.

In April 2026, the Ministry of Finance estimated that rising construction costs had reduced the cost–benefit ratio of the extension to Sapporo to 0.6, below the 1.0 threshold required for new Shinkansen construction. The estimate placed the project within the range classified as "should be discontinued in principle" under government evaluation criteria.

Tunneling work on the 5,265 m (3.272 mi) Murayama Tunnel, situated about 1 kilometer (0.6 mi) north of Shin-Hakodate-Hokuto station commenced in March 2015. However in July 2016 the short section between the Murayama Tunnel and the next tunnel (26,470 m) was deemed unnecessary so the construction altered and the planned two tunnels were integrated into the Toshima Tunnel with a total length of 32,675 m. When opened, it will be the longest land tunnel in the country.

The 211.3 km (131.3 mi) extension will be approximately 76% in tunnels, including major tunnels such as Toshima (mentioned above), Oshima (26.5 km or 16.5 mi), Teine (18.8 km or 11.7 mi) and Shiribeshi (18 km or 11 mi).

When the section to Sapporo opens, the estimated journey time from Tokyo to Sapporo will be at most 5 hours and 1 minute.

In May 2019, JR Hokkaido announced that it had requested permission from the MLIT to increase the speed limit on the 212 km (132 mi) of new track to be constructed between Shin-Hakodate-Hokuto and Sapporo to 320 km/h (200 mph). This would involve the extension of buffers on about 170 km (110 mi) of tunnels, installation of sound barriers on about 30 km (19 mi) of the remaining 42 km (26 mi) of surface track and strengthening of viaducts.
