= Hayabusa (train) =

Japanese high-speed Shinkansen train service

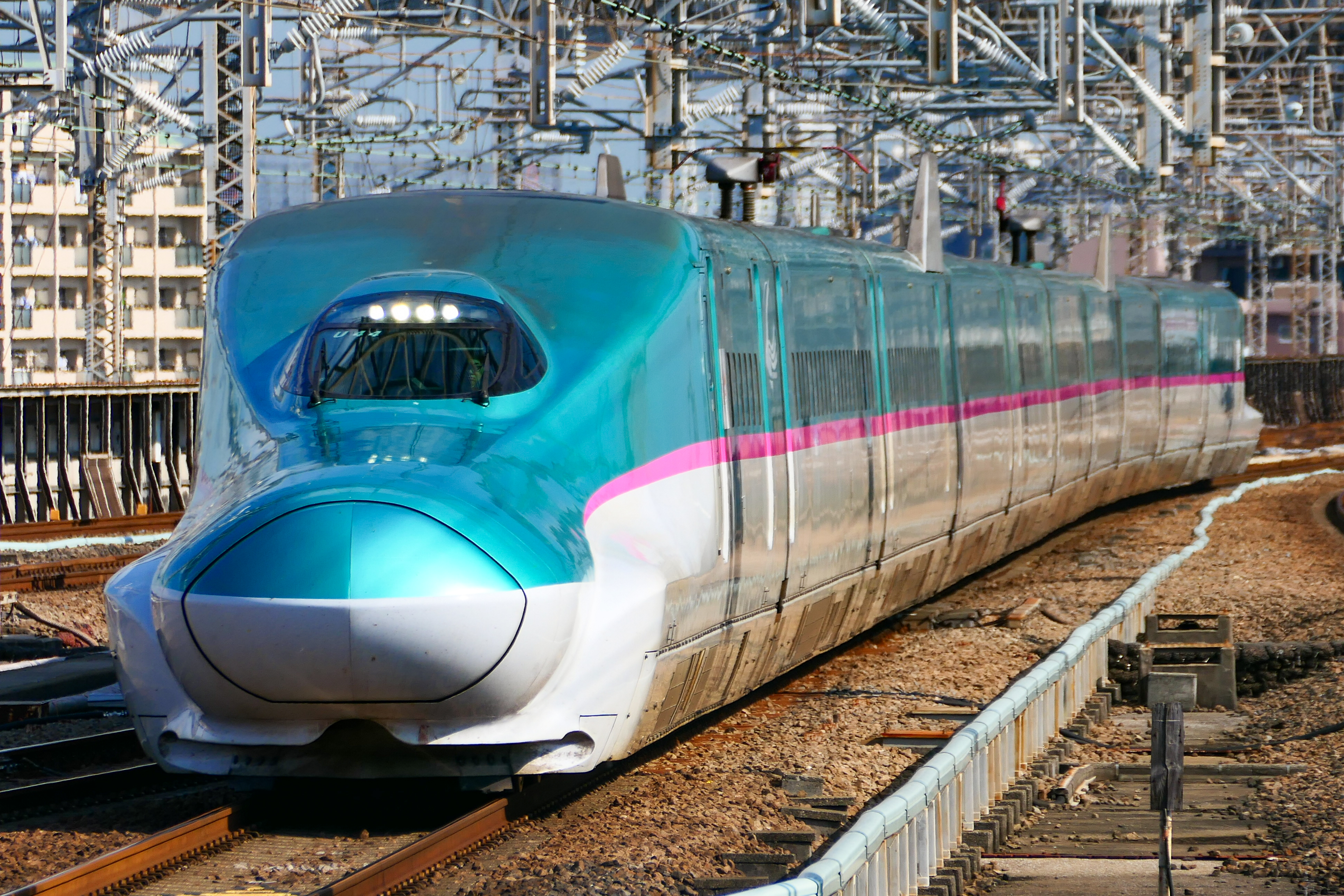
- E5 series set operating a Hayabusa service entering Ōmiya Station, March 2023

Overview
- Service type: Shinkansen (Express)
- Status: Operational
- Locale: Honshu/Hokkaido, Japan
- Predecessor: Hayate
- First service: 5 March 2011
- Current operators: JR East; JR Hokkaido

Route
- Termini: Tokyo; Shin-Hakodate-Hokuto
- Distance travelled: 823.7 km (511.8 mi)
- Average journey time: 3 hours, 57 minutes
- Lines used: Tōhoku Shinkansen; Hokkaido Shinkansen

On-board services
- Classes: Ordinary, Green, Gran Class
- Seating arrangements: 3+2 (Ordinary car); 2+2 (Green car); 1+2 (Gran Class)
- Catering facilities: Trolley service

Technical
- Rolling stock: E5 and H5 series
- Track gauge: 1,435 mm (4 ft 8 1/2 in) standard gauge
- Electrification: Overhead line, 25 kV 50 Hz AC
- Operating speed: 320 km/h (200 mph)
- Track owners: JR East (Tōkyō–Morioka); JRTT (Morioka–Shin-Hakodate-Hokuto)

The Hayabusa (Japanese: はやぶさ; lit. 'peregrine falcon') is an express high-speed Shinkansen service operated by East Japan Railway Company (JR East) and Hokkaido Railway Company (JR Hokkaido) between Tokyo and Shin-Hakodate-Hokuto in Japan since 26 March 2016. The name was formerly used for a limited express sleeping car service operated by JR Kyushu, which ran from Tokyo to Kumamoto, and was discontinued in March 2009.

== Stopping pattern ==
Short turn trains starting or ending at Morioka stop at all or selected stations between Furukawa and Shin-Hanamaki, while trains starting or ending at Shin-Aomori or Shin-Hakodate-Hokuto pass these stations.

Legend:

●	All trains stop
▲	Some trains stop
|	All trains pass

Station	Distance from Tokyo km (mi)	Stop pattern		
Tokyo	0 (0)	●	●	●
Ueno	3.6 (2.2)	▲	▲	▲
Ōmiya	31.3 (19.4)	●	●	●
Sendai	325.4 (202.2)	●	●	●
Furukawa	363.8 (226.1)	|	|	▲
Kurikoma-Kōgen	385.7 (239.7)	|	|	▲
Ichinoseki	406.3 (252.5)	|	|	▲
Mizusawa-Esashi	431.3 (268.0)	|	|	▲
Kitakami	448.6 (278.7)	|	|	▲
Shin-Hanamaki	463.1 (287.8)	|	|	▲
Morioka	496.5 (308.5)	●	●	●
Iwate-Numakunai	527.6 (327.8)	▲	▲	
Ninohe	562.2 (349.3)	▲	▲	
Hachinohe	593.1 (368.5)	▲	▲	
Shichinohe-Towada	629.2 (391.0)	▲	▲	
Shin-Aomori	674.9 (419.4)	●	●	
Okutsugaru-Imabetsu	713.4 (443.3)	▲		
Kikonai	788.2 (489.8)	▲		
Shin-Hakodate-Hokuto	823.7 (511.8)	●		

=== Operations ===
Most Hayabusa services operate coupled with Komachi services between Tokyo and Morioka, where they uncouple and travel on the Akita Shinkansen.

With a total length of 674.9 kilometres (419.4 mi), the Tōhoku Shinkansen is the longest Shinkansen line in Japan and includes the network’s highest scheduled operating speed, with trains reaching 320 kilometres per hour (200 mph) over approximately 387.5 kilometres (240.8 mi) between Utsunomiya and Morioka.

As of March 2021, maximum operating speeds are 110 km/h (68 mph) between Tokyo and Ueno, 130 km/h (81 mph) between Ueno and Ōmiya, 275 km/h (171 mph) between Ōmiya and Utsunomiya, 320 km/h (200 mph) between Utsunomiya and Morioka, and 260 km/h (160 mph) between Morioka and the Seikan Tunnel. Trains slow to 160 km/h (99 mph) in the tunnel, except during periods when freight services are suspended, when the full 260 km/h (160 mph) is permitted. Between the Seikan Tunnel and Shin-Hakodate-Hokuto, the maximum speed is 260 km/h (160 mph).

The fastest services between Tokyo and Shin-Hakodate-Hokuto take approximately 3 hours 57 minutes.

== Train formation ==
Hayabusa services are normally operated by 10-car E5 series or H5 series trainsets, with car 1 at the Tokyo end. All seats are reserved and non-smoking.

Car No.	1	2	3	4	5	6	7	8	9	10
Class	Ordinary								Green	Gran
Facilities	Toilet		Toilet		Toilet, wheelchair space		Toilet		Toilet, wheelchair space, conductor's office	

Hayabusa trains feature premium GranClass accommodation with 2+1 leather seating and complimentary food and drinks, including alcohol.

In 2021, payphones were removed from cars 3 and 5.

== History ==
=== Sleeping car service (1958–2009) ===
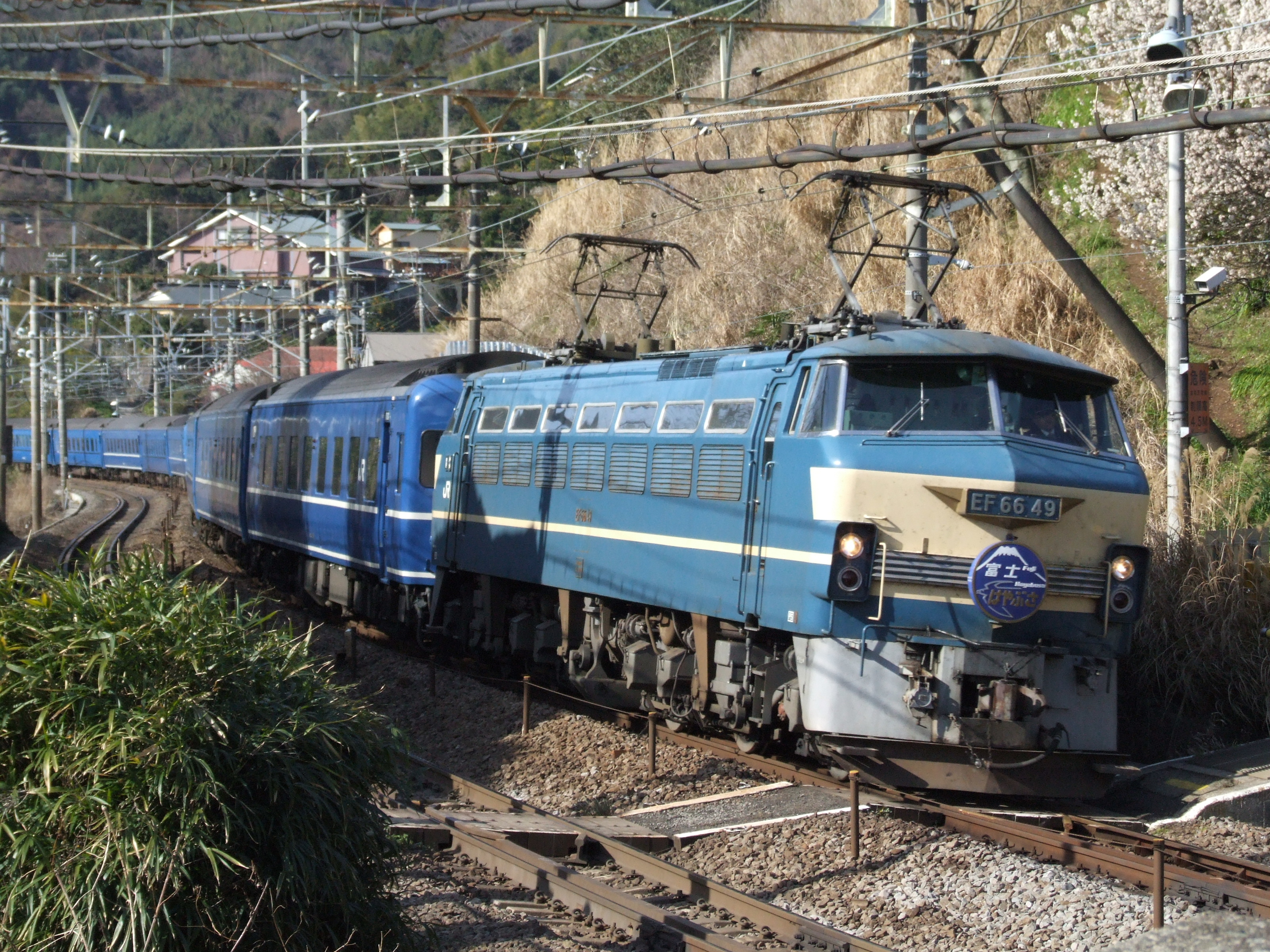
Combined Fuji/Hayabusa service hauled by an EF66 locomotive, March 2009

The Hayabusa service commenced on 1 October 1958, operating between Tokyo and Kagoshima. From 20 July 1960, the train was upgraded with 20 series sleeping cars, and extended to run to and from Nishi-Kagoshima (now Kagoshima-Chūō). From 9 March 1975, the train was upgraded with 24 series sleeping cars.

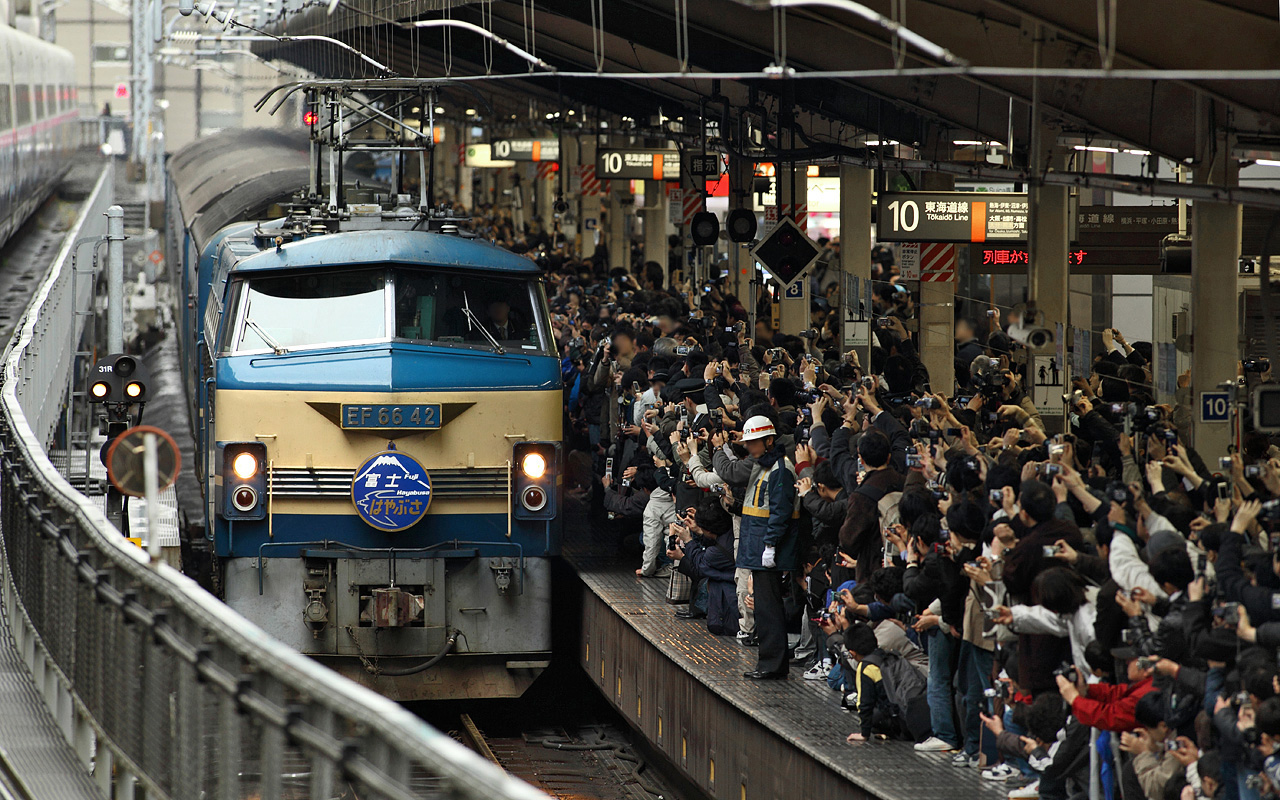
The final Hayabusa and Fuji service after arriving at Tokyo Station, 14 March 2009

The Hayabusa, along with its counterpart service, the Fuji, was discontinued from the start of the revised timetable on 14 March 2009 due to declining ridership.

=== Shinkansen service (2011–) ===
From 5 March 2011, the Hayabusa name was revived for the new 300 km/h (190 mph) shinkansen services operated by JR East between Tokyo and Shin-Aomori using new E5 series trainsets, and extended to Shin-Hakodate-Hokuto Station on 26 March 2016.

== Rolling stock ==
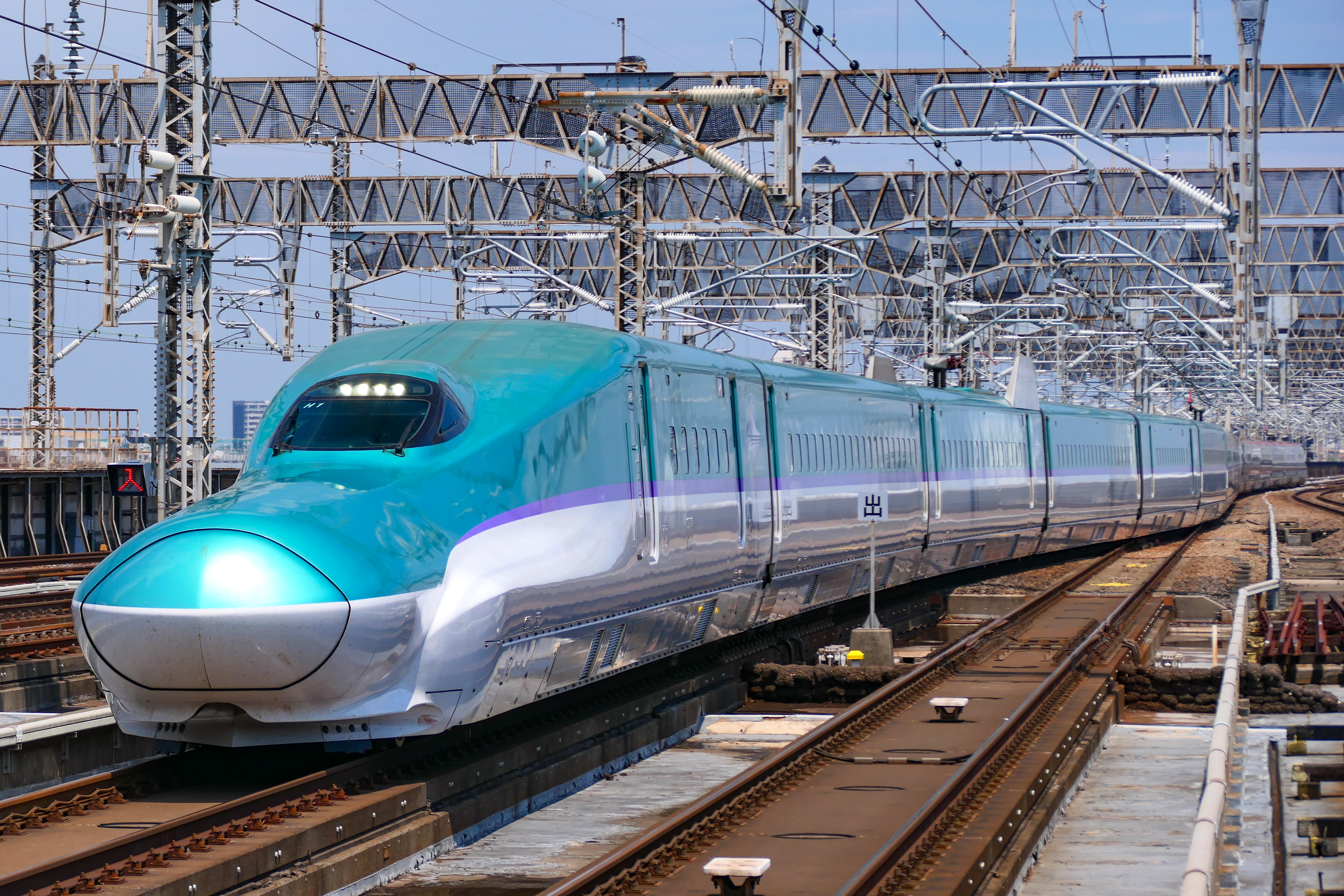
JR Hokkaido H5 series set H1 on a combined Hayabusa and Komachi service in June 2022

The Hayabusa services use 10-car E5 series sets, which initially operated at a maximum speed of 300 km/h (190 mph) between Utsunomiya and Morioka. The maximum speed was raised to 320 km/h (200 mph) from the start of the revised timetable on 16 March 2013. From the same date, some services run coupled to E6 series Super Komachi services between Tokyo and Morioka. These services were limited to a maximum speed of 300 km/h (190 mph). Although the train could run up to speeds of 400 km/h (250 mph) during test runs, from 2012 its top speed was fixed to 320 km/h for passenger and environmental comfort. Since 15 March 2014, the name of Super Komachi services was returned simply to Komachi, and the maximum speed has been raised to 320 km/h; from the same date, some Hayabusa services are operated by 10-car E5 series sets coupled to 7-car E6 series sets. At Morioka, the E5 series and E6 series sets decouple, with the E5 series set continuing along the Tohoku Shinkansen as the Hayabusa and the E6 series set turning onto the Akita Shinkansen as the Komachi.

From 26 March 2016, with the opening of the Hokkaido Shinkansen from Shin-Aomori to Shin-Hakodate-Hokuto, the Hayabusa name was used for services operating between Tokyo, Sendai, and Shin-Hakodate-Hokuto. From the start of the 26 March 2016 timetable revision, ten return services operate daily between Tokyo and Shin-Hakodate-Hokuto, and one return service daily operates between Sendai and Shin-Hakodate-Hokuto.

== See also ==
- Tōhoku Shinkansen
- Blue Train (Japan)
- High-speed rail
- List of named passenger trains of Japan
- Bullet Train Explosion, 2025 action film featuring the Hayabusa
