= Oshamambe Station =

Railway station in Oshamambe, Hokkaido, Japan

Coordinates: 42°30′45″N 140°22′30″E

H47 Oshamambe Station 長万部駅
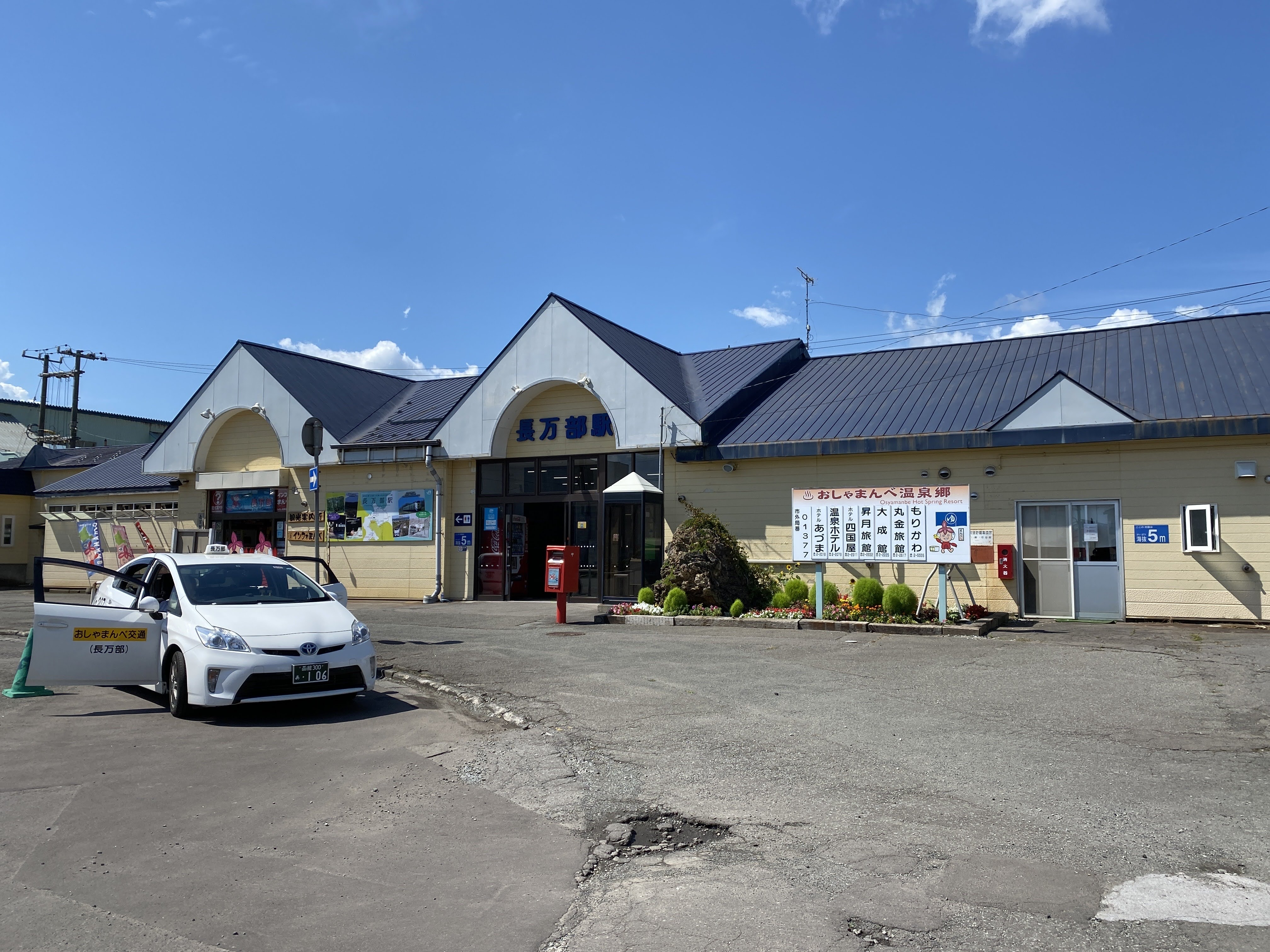
- Oshamambe Station in September 2021

Japanese name
- Shinjitai: 長万部駅
- Kyūjitai: 長萬部驛
- Hiragana: おしゃまんべえき

General information
- Location: 228–7 Oshamambe, Oshamambe Town; Hokkaido Prefecture; Japan
- Operator: JR Hokkaido
- Lines: Hakodate Main Line; Muroran Main Line; Hokkaido Shinkansen (in 2038)
- Platforms: 2 island platforms
- Tracks: 4
- Connections: Bus stop

Other information
- Status: Staffed (Midori no Madoguchi)
- Station code: H47

History
- Opened: 3 November 1903; 123 years ago

Services
Preceding station	JR Hokkaido	Following station
Kunnui towards Hakodate	Hakodate Main Line Local	Futamata towards Asahikawa
Terminus	Muroran Main Line Local	Shizukari towards Iwamizawa
Under Construction
Shin-Yakumo towards Shin-Aomori	Hokkaido Shinkansen Opens in 2038	Kutchan towards Sapporo
Location
- Location within Hokkaido Location within Japan

Oshamambe Station (長万部駅, Oshamanbe-eki) is a railway station in Oshamambe, Hokkaido, Japan, operated by Hokkaido Railway Company (JR Hokkaido).

== Lines ==
Oshamambe Station is served by the Hakodate Main Line from Hakodate to Asahikawa and the Muroran Main Line to Iwamizawa.

The station is also planned to become a station of the Hokkaido Shinkansen between Shin-Yakumo and Kutchan that is scheduled to open in 2031. The first phase to Shin-Hakodate-Hokuto opened in 2016.

== Station layout ==
The station consists of two ground-level island platforms serving four tracks.

=== Platforms ===
1	■ Hakodate Main Line	for Hakodate (Limited express services)
2	■ Muroran Main Line	for Higashi-Muroran, Tomakomai and Sapporo (Limited express services)
3/4	■ Hakodate Main Line	for Mori and Hakodate (Local services)
3/4	■ Hakodate Main Line	for Kutchan and Otaru (Local services)
3/4	■ Muroran Main Line	for Higashi-Muroran, Tomakomai and Sapporo (Local services)

== Limited express services ==
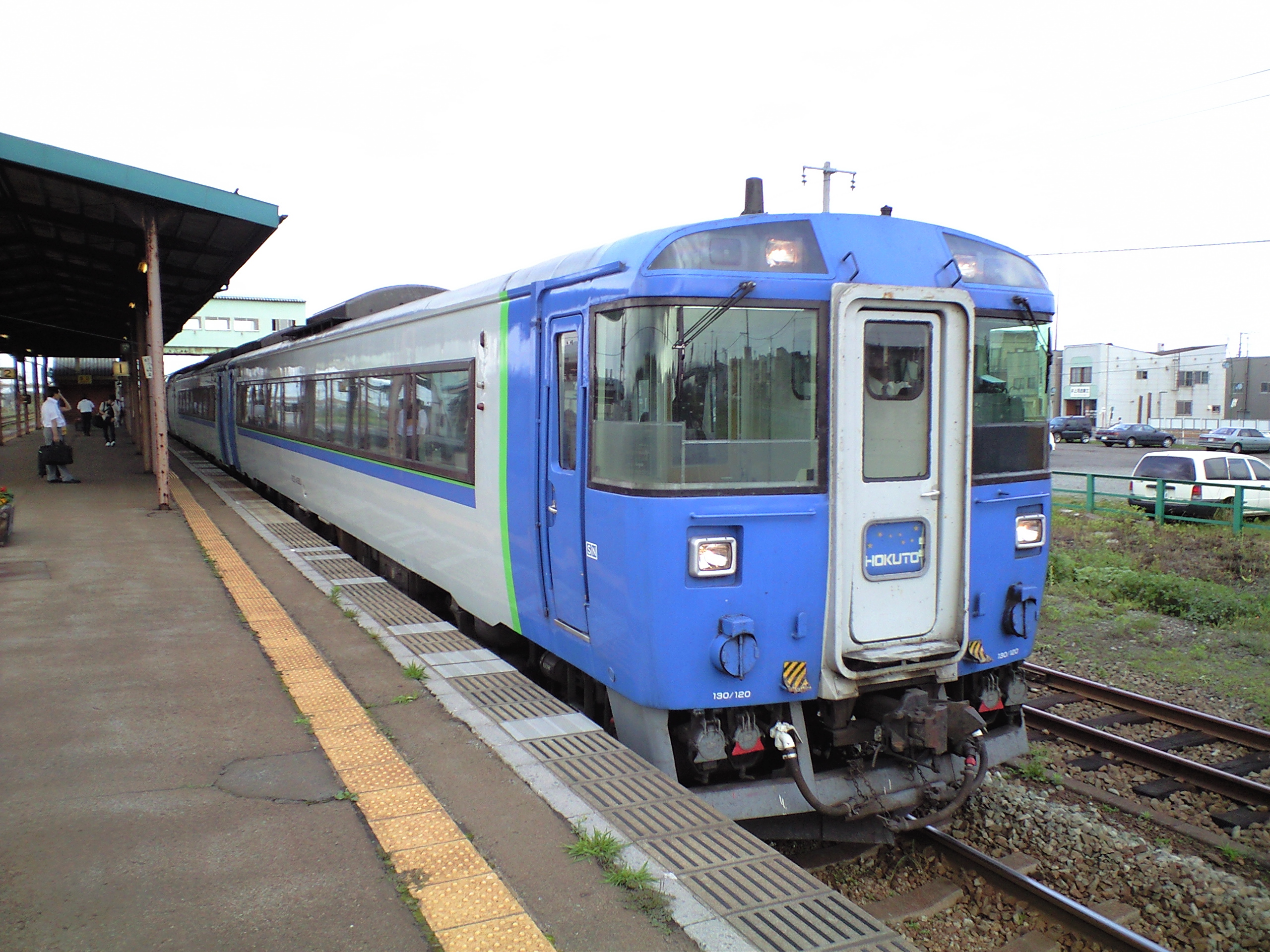
A Hokuto limited express service at Oshamambe Station in July 2008

- Hokuto (Sapporo – Hakodate)

== History ==
The station opened on 3 November 1903. With the privatization of Japanese National Railways (JNR) on 1 April 1987, the station came under the control of JR Hokkaido.

== Surrounding area ==
- National Route 5
- National Route 37
- Tokyo University of Science Oshamambe Campus
- Hokkaido Oshamambe High School

=== Bus services ===
- Hakodate Bus
  - For Imakane and Setana
  - For Yakumo, Mori, and Hakodate
- Niseko Bus
  - For Kuromatsunai and Suttsu

== See also ==
- List of railway stations in Japan
