= Hayate (train) =

Japanese high-speed Shinkansen service

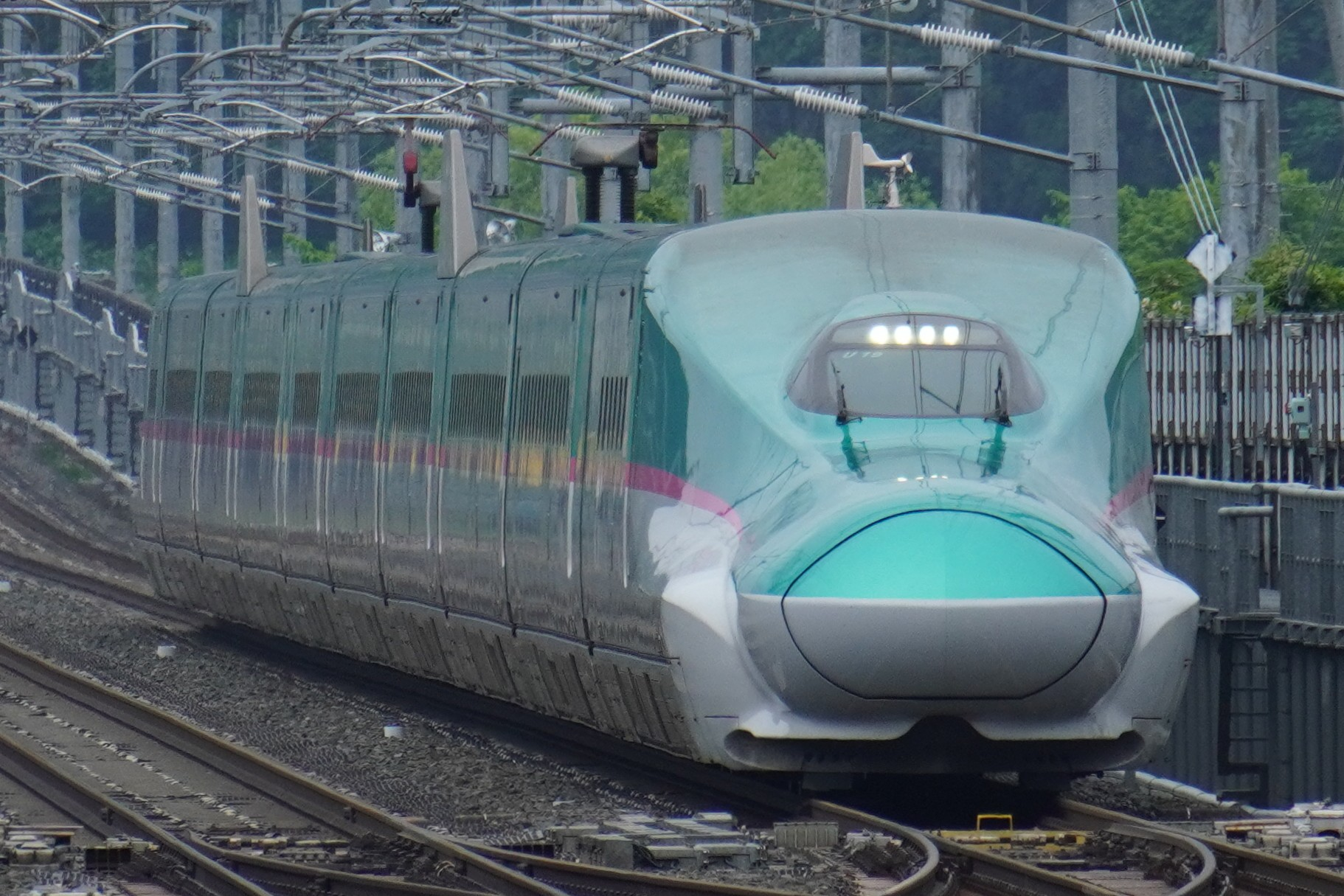
- E5 series set operating a Hayate service entering Hachinohe Station, May 2023

Overview
- Service type: Shinkansen (Local)
- Status: Operational
- Locale: Honshu/Hokkaido, Japan
- First service: 1 December 2002
- Successor: Hayabusa
- Current operators: JR East; JR Hokkaido

Route
- Termini: Shin-Hakodate-Hokuto; Morioka
- Stops: 7
- Service frequency: 2 round trips daily
- Train number: 91, 93, 98, 100
- Lines used: Tōhoku Shinkansen; Hokkaido Shinkansen

On-board services
- Classes: Ordinary, Green, Gran Class
- Seating arrangements: 2+3 (Ordinary car); 2+2 (Green car); 1+2 (Gran Class)
- Catering facilities: Trolley service

Technical
- Rolling stock: E5 and H5 series
- Track gauge: 1,435 mm (4 ft 8 1/2 in) standard gauge
- Electrification: Overhead line, 25 kV 50 Hz AC
- Operating speed: Tōhoku: 275 km/h (171 mph); Hokkaido: 260 km/h (160 mph)
- Track owner: JRTT

Hayate (Japanese: はやて) is a local high-speed Shinkansen service operated on the Tōhoku Shinkansen by the East Japan Railway Company (JR East) since 2002 and on the Hokkaido Shinkansen by the Hokkaido Railway Company (JR Hokkaido) since 26 March 2016. It operates as far as the northern terminus of Shin-Hakodate-Hokuto, and it is the second-fastest service on the Tohoku Shinkansen. These services were inaugurated with the opening of the Tohoku Shinkansen extension to Hachinohe on 1 December 2002.

The name "Hayate" has not been used previously on any train service in Japan. The name was chosen with input from the public; roughly translated, it means a strong or violent wind; however, it carries positive connotations of speed and power.

== History ==
=== Introduction ===
In December 2002, the Tohoku Shinkansen extended to Hachinohe. As a result, the Hayate was introduced, in order to serve the newly extended section between Morioka and Hachinohe. Hayate trains ran between Tokyo and Hachinohe, and skips all stations between Ōmiya and Sendai. The Hayate was established as the fastest service on the Tohoku Shinkansen at that time, which also established its position as the predecessor of the Hayabusa. All seats onboard Hayate trains required reservation due to the popularity of Shinkansen services from Tokyo to the Tohoku region. Hayate trains were operated by 10-car E2 series units, which ran at a top speed of 275 km/h (171 mph)

=== Shin-Aomori Extension ===
On 4 December 2010, the Tohoku Shinkansen extended again to Shin-Aomori. And on 19 November 2011, E5 series trainsets, with maximum speeds of 320 km/h (200 mph), were introduced to the line, with some of them used on Hayate services. The introduction of the E5 series resulted in the introduction of the Hayabusa, which replaced the Hayate's role as the fastest train on the line. In addition, currently E5 series Hayate services still run at a top speed of 275 km/h (171 mph). JR East reduced Hayate services over the years, and unify the discontinued Hayate services to Hayabusa services. It now serves as a complementary service to the Hayabusa.

=== Opening of the Hokkaido Shinkansen ===
From 26 March 2016, with the opening of the Hokkaido Shinkansen from Shin-Aomori to Shin-Hakodate-Hokuto, the Hayate name is now used for services operating between Morioka, Shin-Aomori, and Shin-Hakodate-Hokuto. As of March 2016, one return service operates daily between Morioka and Shin-Hakodate-Hokuto, and one return service daily operates between Shin-Aomori and Shin-Hakodate-Hokuto. These services are formed of 10-car E5 or H5 series trainsets.

=== Past services with Komachi ===
In the past Hayate services used to couple with Komachi services from Tokyo to Morioka, where the Komachi cars are uncoupled and proceed to Akita Station via the Akita Shinkansen. However currently all Komachi trains now couple with Hayabusa trains, so all Hayate trains now run alone.

== Stations and service pattern ==
As of 22 May 2020, two Hayate round trips operate each day. Northbound services 91 and 93 run to Shin-Hakodate-Hokuto in the morning, while southbound services 98 and 100 operate from Shin-Hakodate-Hokuto in the evening. These services stop at the following stations:

Station	Distance from Shin-Hakodate-Hokuto km (mi)	Train Number	
Station	Distance from Shin-Hakodate-Hokuto km (mi)	93, 98	91, 100
Shin-Hakodate-Hokuto	0 (0)	●	●
Kikonai	35.5 (22.1)	●	●
Okutsugaru-Imabetsu	110.3 (68.5)	●	●
Shin-Aomori	148.8 (92.5)	●	●
Shichinohe-Towada	194.5 (120.9)	●	
Hachinohe	230.6 (143.3)	●	
Ninohe	261.5 (162.5)	●	
Morioka	327.2 (203.3)	●	

=== Travel time ===
- Morioka - Shin-Hakodate-Hokuto: 2 hours, 9 minutes
- Shin-Aomori - Shin-Hakodate-Hokuto: 1 hour, 6 minutes

== Rolling stock ==
- E5 series (since November 2011)
- H5 series (since 26 March 2016)
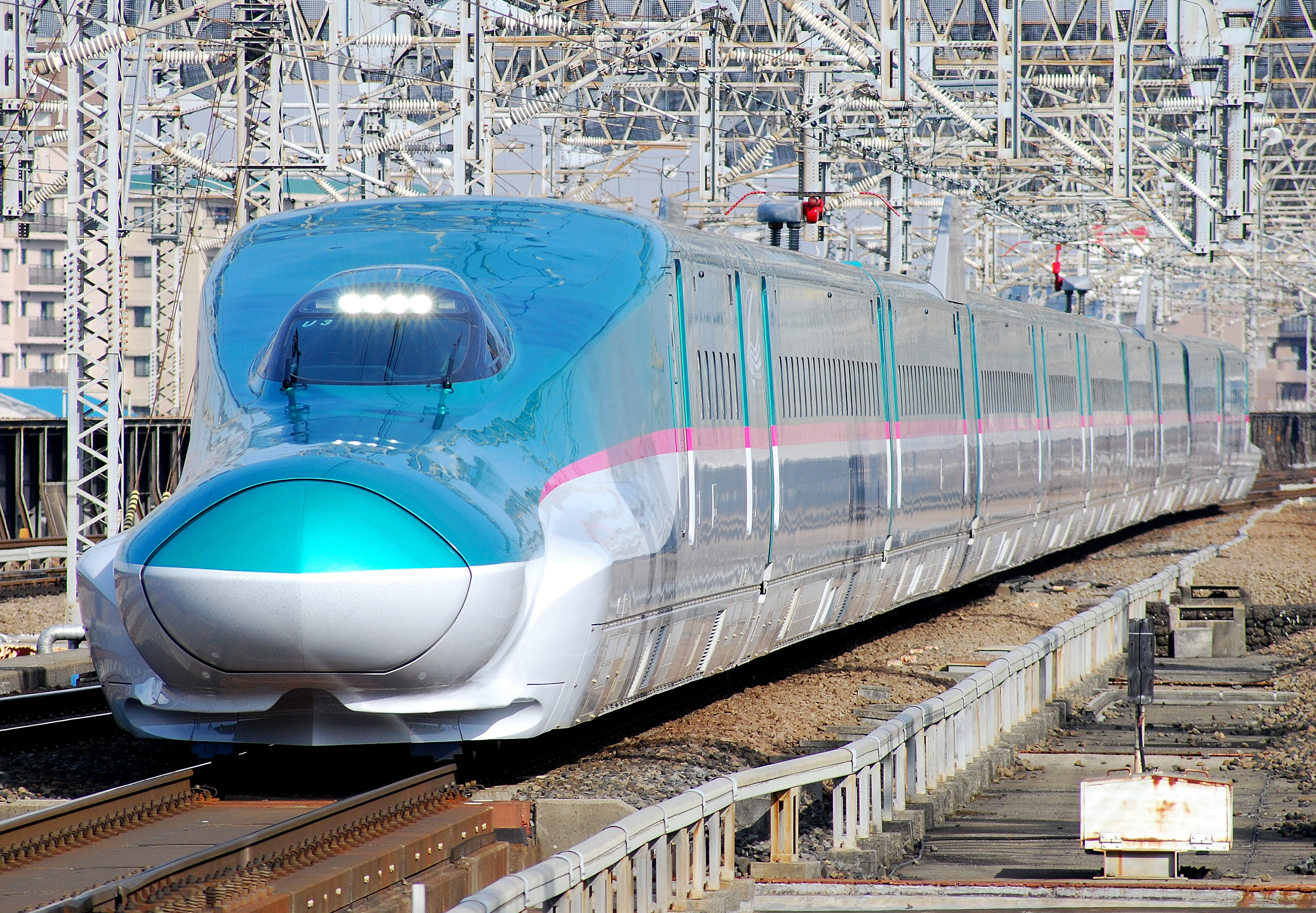
E5 series

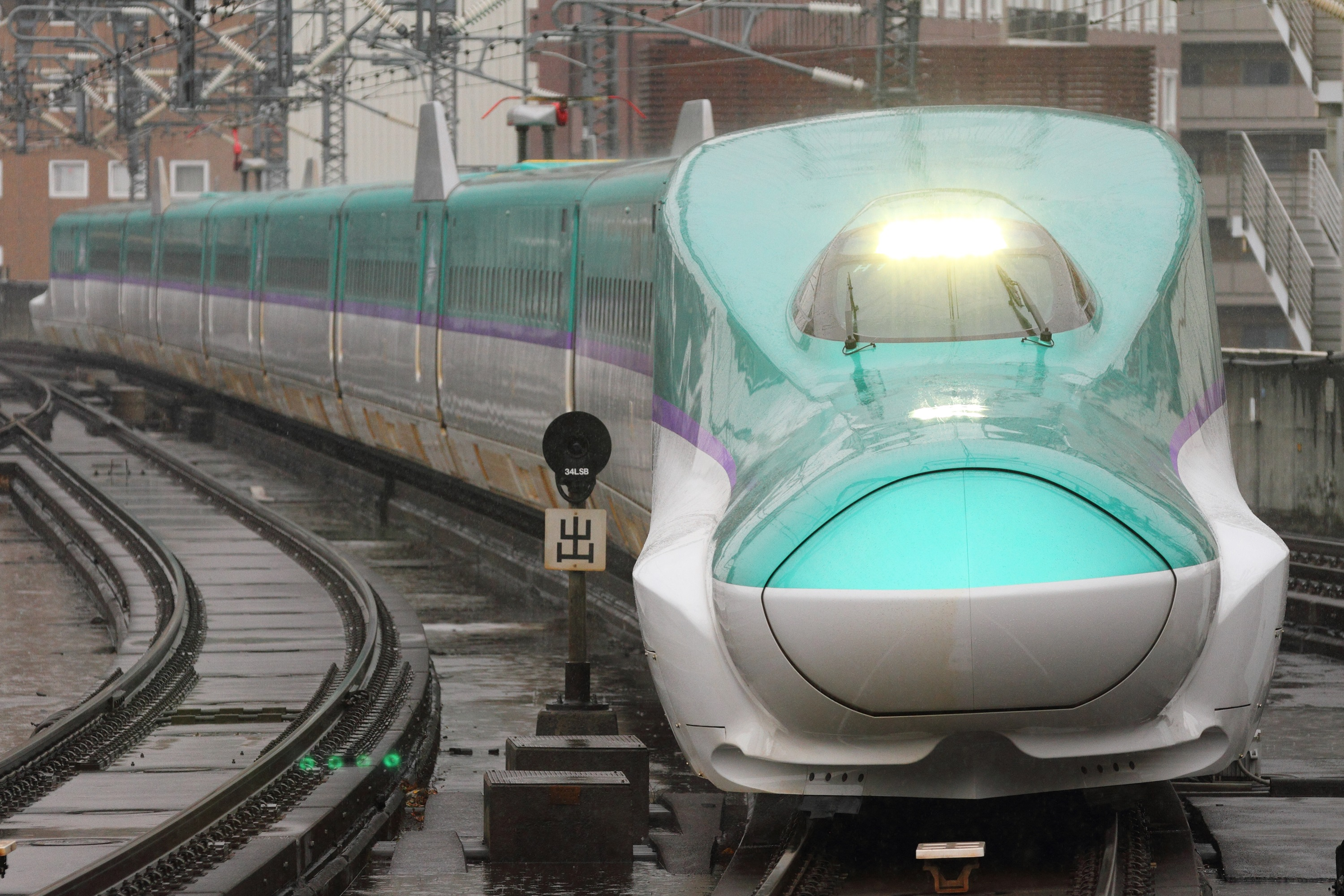
H5 series

=== Former rolling stock ===
- E2 series (1 December 2002 - 16 March 2019)
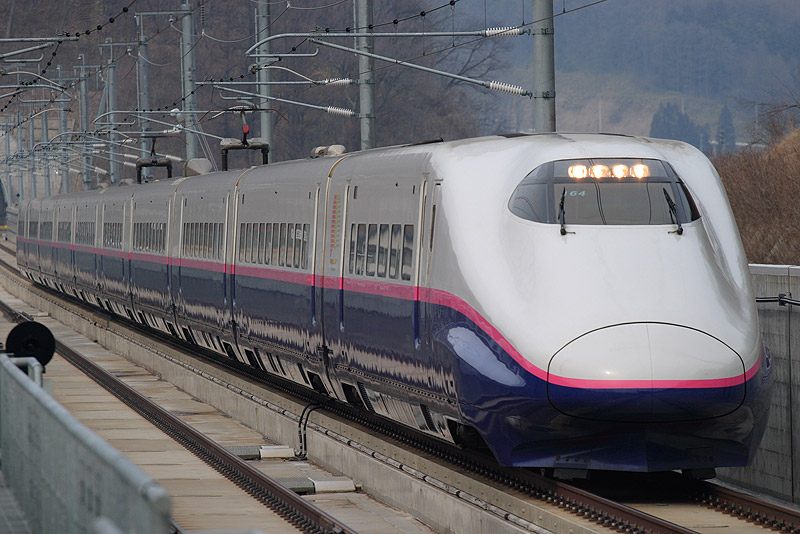
E2 series

== Train formation ==
Hayate services are normally operated by 10-car E5 series or H5 series trainsets, with car 10 at the Shin-Hakodate-Hokuto end. All seats are reserved and non-smoking.

Car No.	1	2	3	4	5	6	7	8	9	10
Class	Ordinary								Green	Gran
Facilities	Toilet		Toilet		Toilet, wheelchair space		Toilet		Toilet, wheelchair space, conductor's office	

== See also ==
- Tōhoku Shinkansen
- List of named passenger trains of Japan
