= Shin-Aomori Station =

Railway station in Aomori, Aomori Prefecture, Japan

Shin-Aomori Station 新青森駅
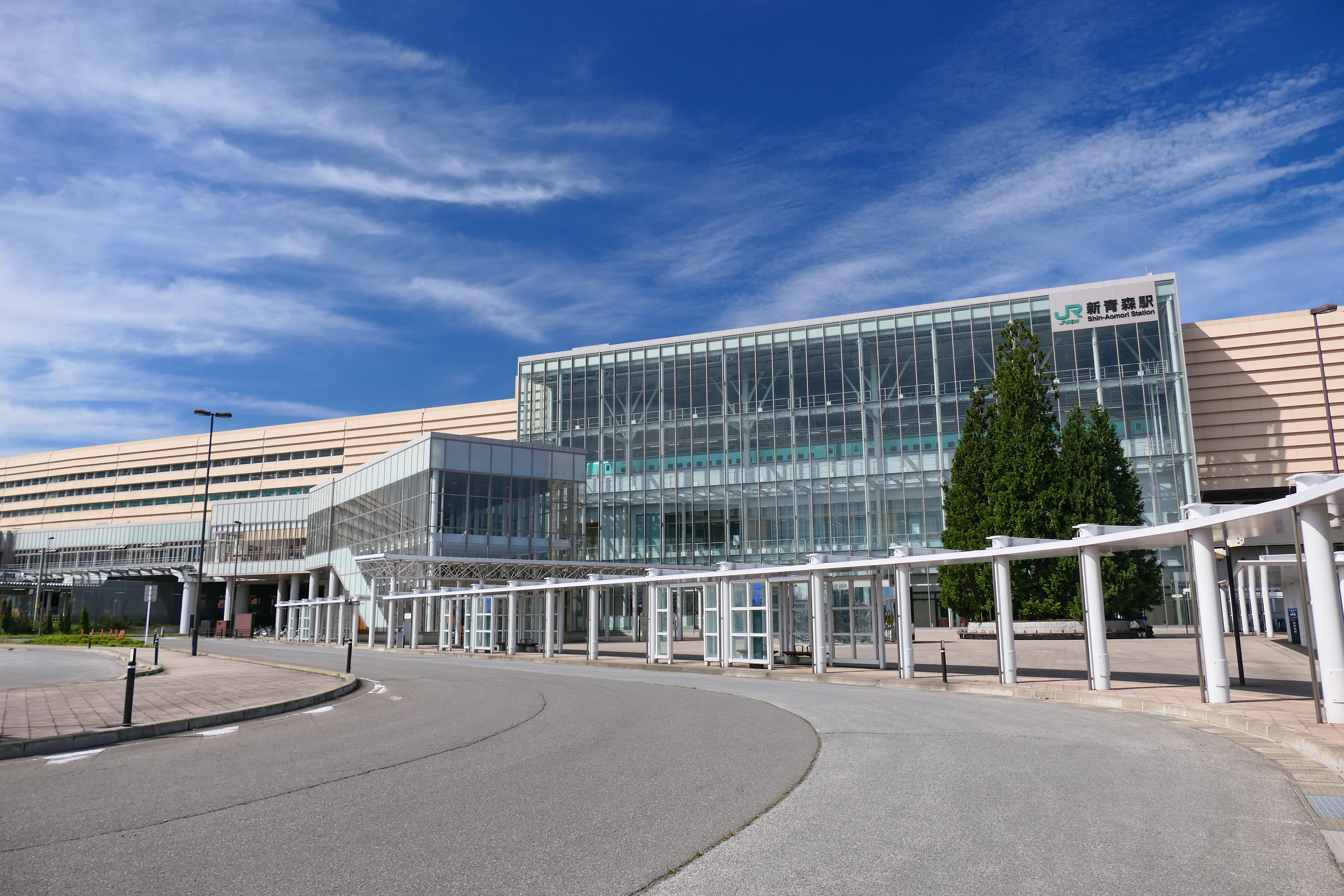
- The east entrance in September 2022

General information
- Location: Ishie; Aomori; Japan
- Coordinates: 40°49′39″N 140°41′36.5″E
- Operator: JR East
- Lines: Tōhoku Shinkansen; Hokkaido Shinkansen; Ōu Main Line
- Distance: 674.9 km (419.4 mi) from Tokyo
- Platforms: 3 island platforms
- Tracks: 6
- Connections: Bus stop

Other information
- Status: Staffed (Midori no Madoguchi)
- Website: Official website

History
- Opened: 1 November 1986; 39 years ago
- Rebuilt: 2010; 16 years ago

Passengers
- FY2016: 7,652 daily

Services
Preceding station	JR East	Following station
Shichinohe-Towada towards Tokyo	Tōhoku Shinkansen Hayabusa	through to Hokkaido Shinkansen
Shichinohe-Towada towards Morioka	Tōhoku Shinkansen Hayate	through to Hokkaido Shinkansen
Namioka towards Akita	Tsugaru	Aomori Terminus
Tsugaru-Shinjō towards Akita	Ōu Main Line Rapid	Aomori Terminus
Tsugaru-Shinjō towards Shinjō	Ōu Main Line Local	Aomori Terminus
Preceding station	JR Hokkaido	Following station
through to Tōhoku Shinkansen	Hokkaido Shinkansen Hayabusa	Okutsugaru-Imabetsu towards Shin-Hakodate-Hokuto
through to Tōhoku Shinkansen	Hokkaido Shinkansen Hayate	Okutsugaru-Imabetsu towards Shin-Hakodate-Hokuto
Location
- Location within Aomori Prefecture Location within Japan

Shin-Aomori Station (Japanese: 新青森駅, Hepburn: Shin-Aomori-eki; lit. 'New Aomori Station') is a railway station in the city of Aomori, Aomori Prefecture, Japan, operated by the East Japan Railway Company (JR East) and the Hokkaido Railway Company (JR Hokkaido).

== Lines ==
Shin-Aomori Station is the northern terminus of the Ōu Main Line from Fukushima via Akita (a distance of 486.3 km (302.2 mi)), although most trains continue to Aomori. It also forms the northern terminus of the high-speed Tōhoku Shinkansen line from Tokyo (a distance of 674.0 km (418.8 mi)), operated by JR East, and the starting point of the Hokkaido Shinkansen to Shin-Hakodate-Hokuto (a distance of 148.9 km (92.5 mi)), operated by JR Hokkaido.

== Station layout ==
The conventional Ōu Main Line has a single island platform, serving two tracks. In addition to regular Ōu Main Line trains, the station serves two round-trips per day of Aoimori Railway trains, as well as two round-trips of the irregular Resort Asunaro (direct to Noheji and the Ōminato Line). Upon the opening of the Tōhoku Shinkansen extension on 4 December 2010, the station became the southern terminus of Hakuchō Limited express services to Hakodate via the Tsugaru Kaikyō Line, which ceased upon commencement of the Hokkaidō Shinkansen in March 2016.

The Shinkansen portion of the station, which opened on 4 December 2010, consists of two elevated island platforms serving four tracks. The platforms are 263 meters long and capable of handling 10-car trains. The station has a Midori no Madoguchi staffed ticket office.

Previously, Shin-Aomori Station was an unstaffed station consisting of a single side platform for bi-directional traffic.

=== Platforms ===
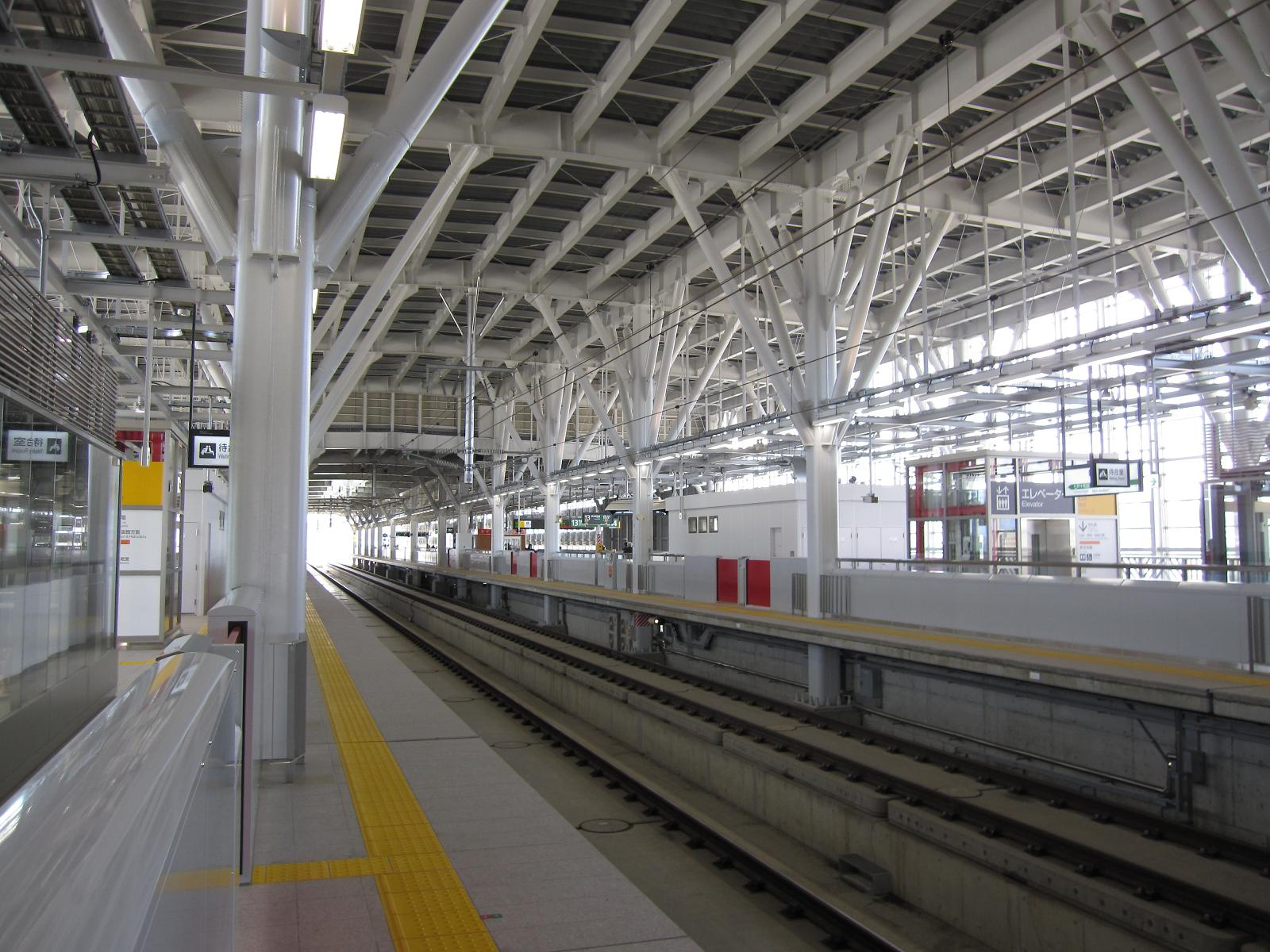
The Shinkansen platforms in November 2010

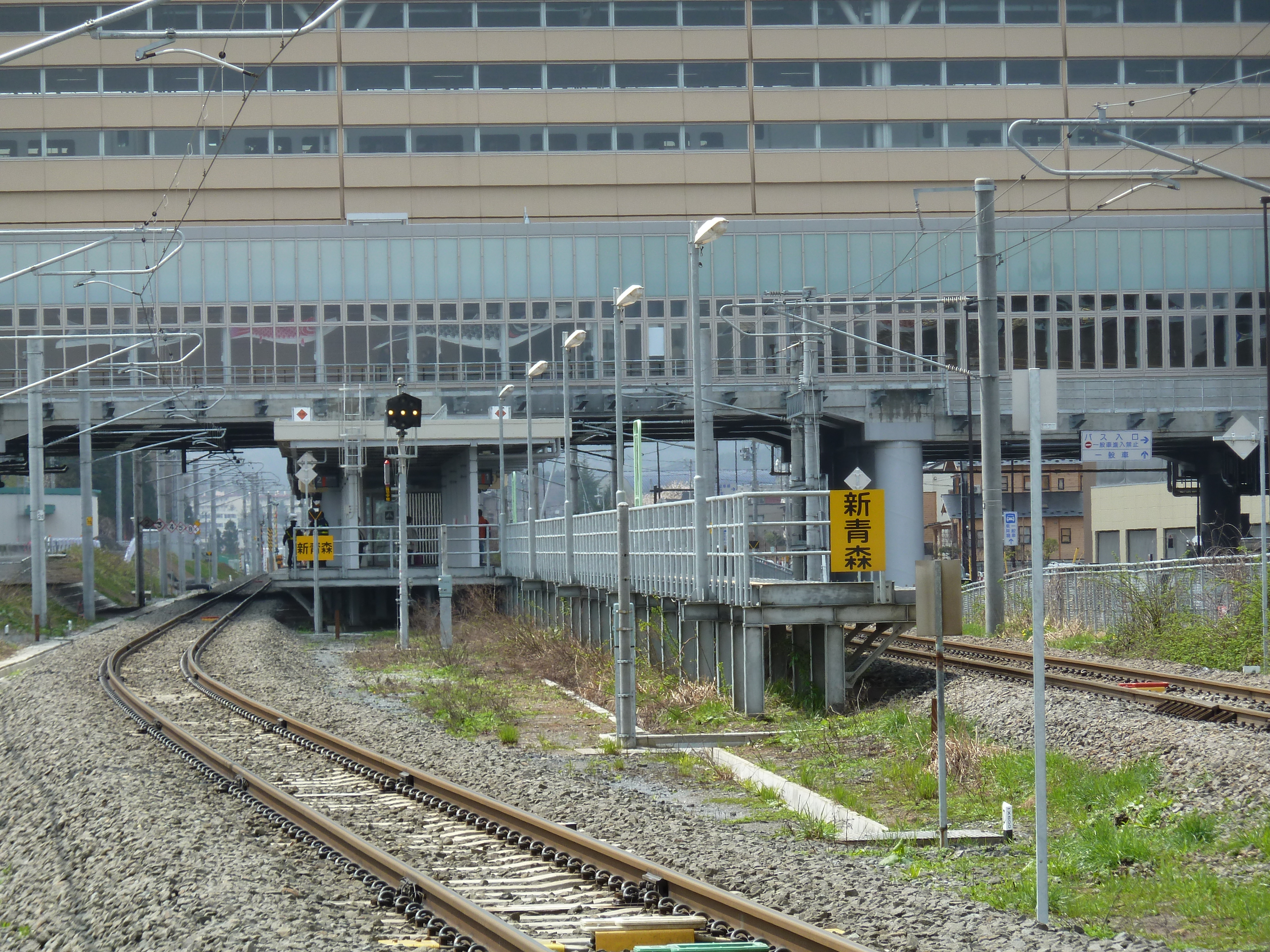
The Ōu Main Line platforms in May 2011

1	■ Ōu Main Line	for Aomori
2	■ Ōu Main Line	for Shinjō and Akita
11,12	■ Tōhoku Shinkansen	for Morioka and Tokyo
13,14	■ Hokkaido Shinkansen	for Shin-Hakodate-Hokuto

== History ==
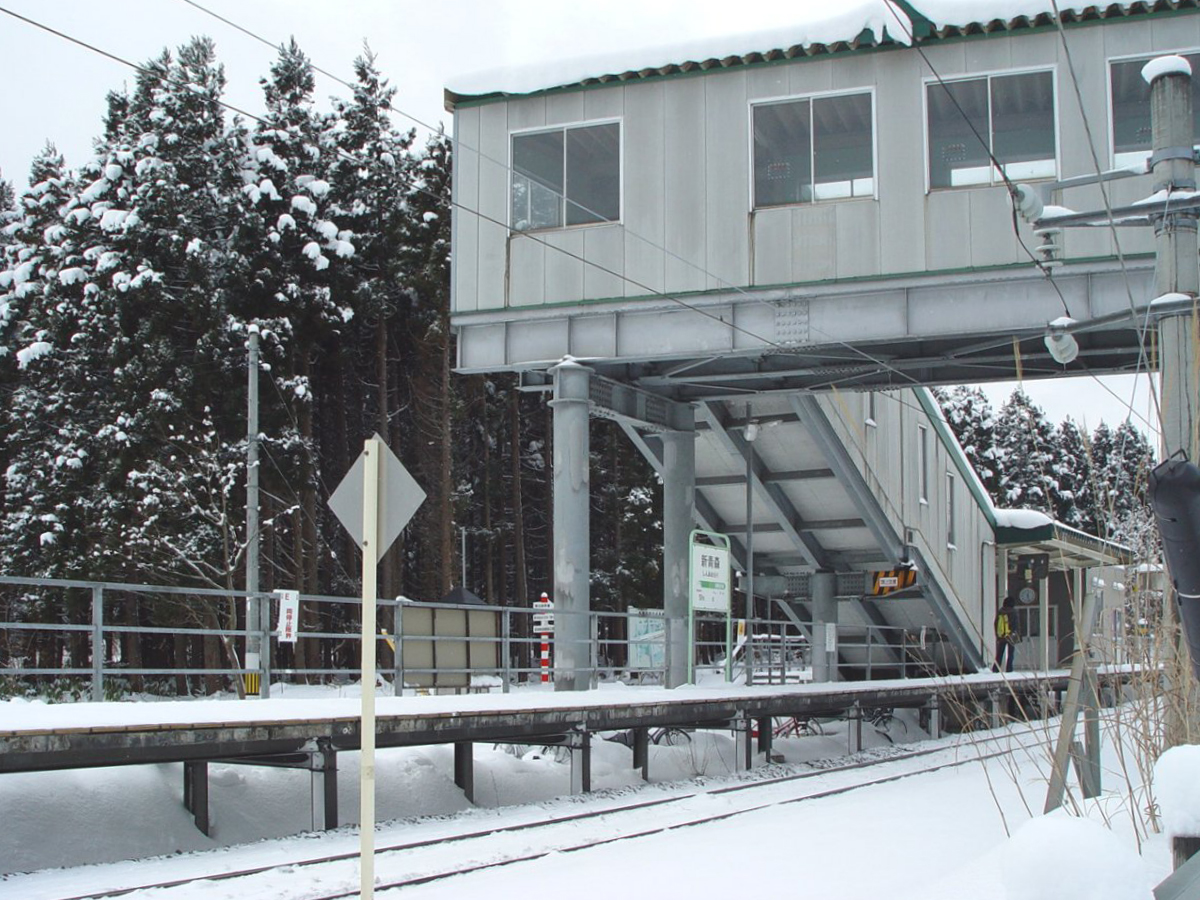
Shin-Aomori station in January 2003 before rebuilding

Shin-Aomori Station opened on 1 November 1986 as a station on the Japanese National Railways (JNR). With the privatization of JNR on 1 April 1987, it came under the operational control of JR East. Work on a new station building began in July 2007, and was completed in 2010 ahead of the opening of the Tōhoku Shinkansen extension on 4 December 2010.

The Hokkaido Shinkansen to Shin-Hakodate-Hokuto opened on 26 March 2016, and is being extended to Sapporo, due to open in 2031. Shinkansen services replaced the former Hakucho and Super Hakucho limited express services from March 2016.

== Passenger statistics ==
In fiscal 2016, the conventional portion station was used by an average of 3,619 passengers daily (boarding passengers only) and the Shinkansen portion by 4,033 passengers. The passenger figures for previous years are as shown below.

Fiscal year	Daily average		Total
Fiscal year	(Conventional)	(Shinkansen)	Total
2010	1,083	–	1,083
2011	2,730	–	2,730
2012	3,319	4,571	7,890
2013	3,639	4,523	8,162

== Surrounding area ==
- National Route 280
- Aomori-Nishi High School
- Shinjo Elementary School
- Galatown Aomori West Mall
- Aomori Kenko Land

== See also ==
- List of railway stations in Japan
