= Kozawa Station =

Railway station in Kyōwa, Hokkaido, Japan

Kozawa Station 小沢駅
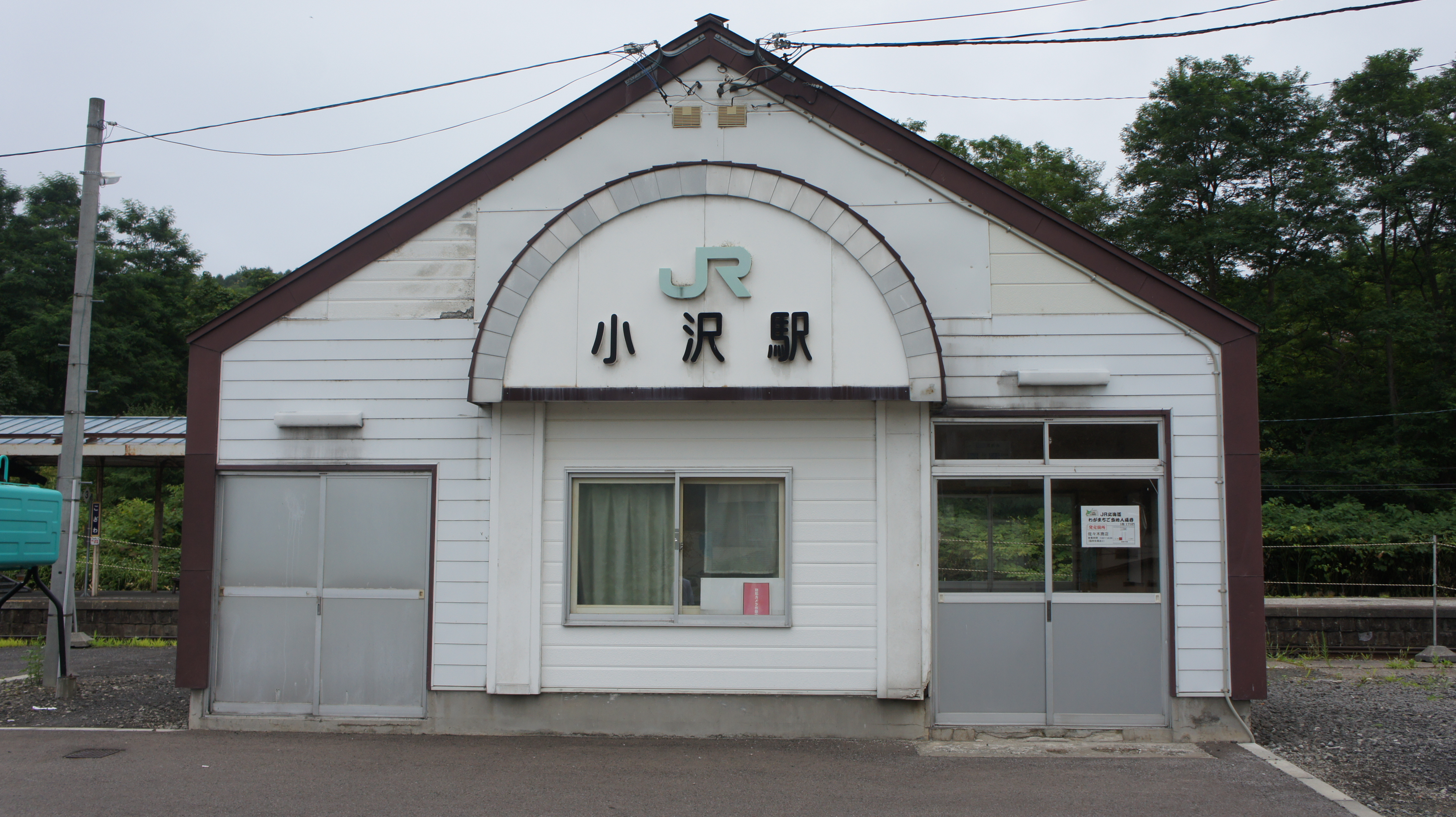
- Kozawa Station in 2017

General information
- Location: Japan
- Coordinates: 42°58′19″N 140°40′39″E
- Operator: JR Hokkaido
- Line: ■ Hakodate Main Line
- Distance: 203.6 km (126.5 mi) from Hakodate
- Platforms: 1 island platform
- Tracks: 2

Construction
- Structure type: At grade

Other information
- Status: Unstaffed
- Station code: S22

History
- Opened: 18 July 1904; 122 years ago

Services
| Preceding station | JR Hokkaido | Following station |
Local
| Kutchan towards Hakodate | Hakodate Main Line Local | Ginzan towards Asahikawa |
Rapid
| Kutchan Terminus | Niseko Liner | Ginzan towards Sapporo |
Location
- Location within Hokkaido Location within Japan

Kozawa Station (小沢駅, Kozawa-eki) is a railway station in Kyōwa, Hokkaidō, Japan. It is operated by JR Hokkaido and has the station number "S22".

== Lines ==
The station is served by the Hakodate Main Line and is 203.6 km from the start of the line at Hakodate.

== Station layout ==
Kozawa Station consists of an island platform connected to the station building by a footbridge.

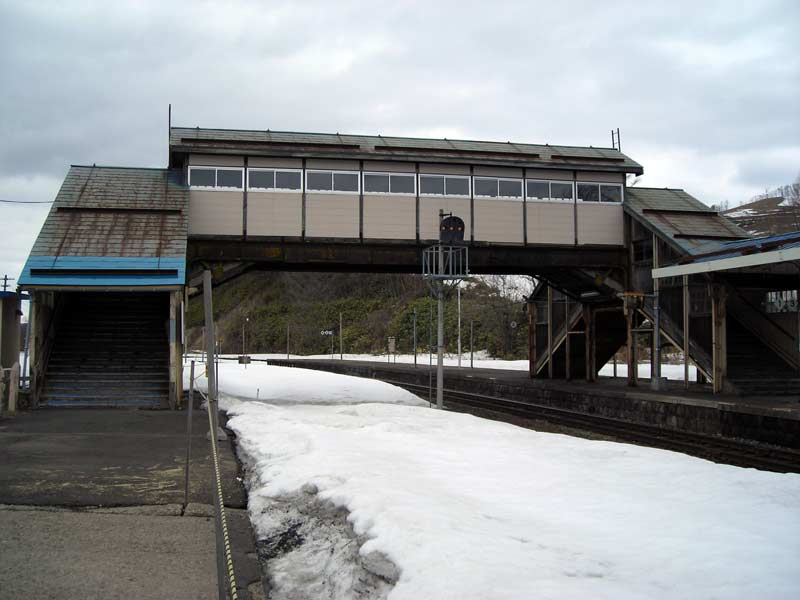
A view of the station platform and tracks.

=== Platforms ===
| 2 | ■ Hakodate Main Line | for Otaru and Sapporo |
| 3 | ■ Hakodate Main Line | for Kutchan and Oshamambe |

== History ==
The privately run Hokkaido Railway opened the station on 18 July 1904 when it extended its track between Ranshima and Shikaribetsu southwards to it. The track was extended further south from Kozawa to Neppu by 19 Oct 1904, establishing through traffic all the way to Hakodate. After the Hokkaido Railway was nationalized on 1 July 1907, Japanese Government Railways (JGR) took over control of the station. On 12 October 1909, the station became part of the Hakodate Main Line. On 1 April 1987, with the privatization of Japanese National Railways (JNR), the successor of JGR, the station came under the control of JR Hokkaido. From 1 October 2007, station numbering was introduced on JR Hokkaido lines, with Kozawa Station becoming "S22".
