= Niki Station =

Railway station in Niki, Hokkaido, Japan

Niki Station 仁木駅
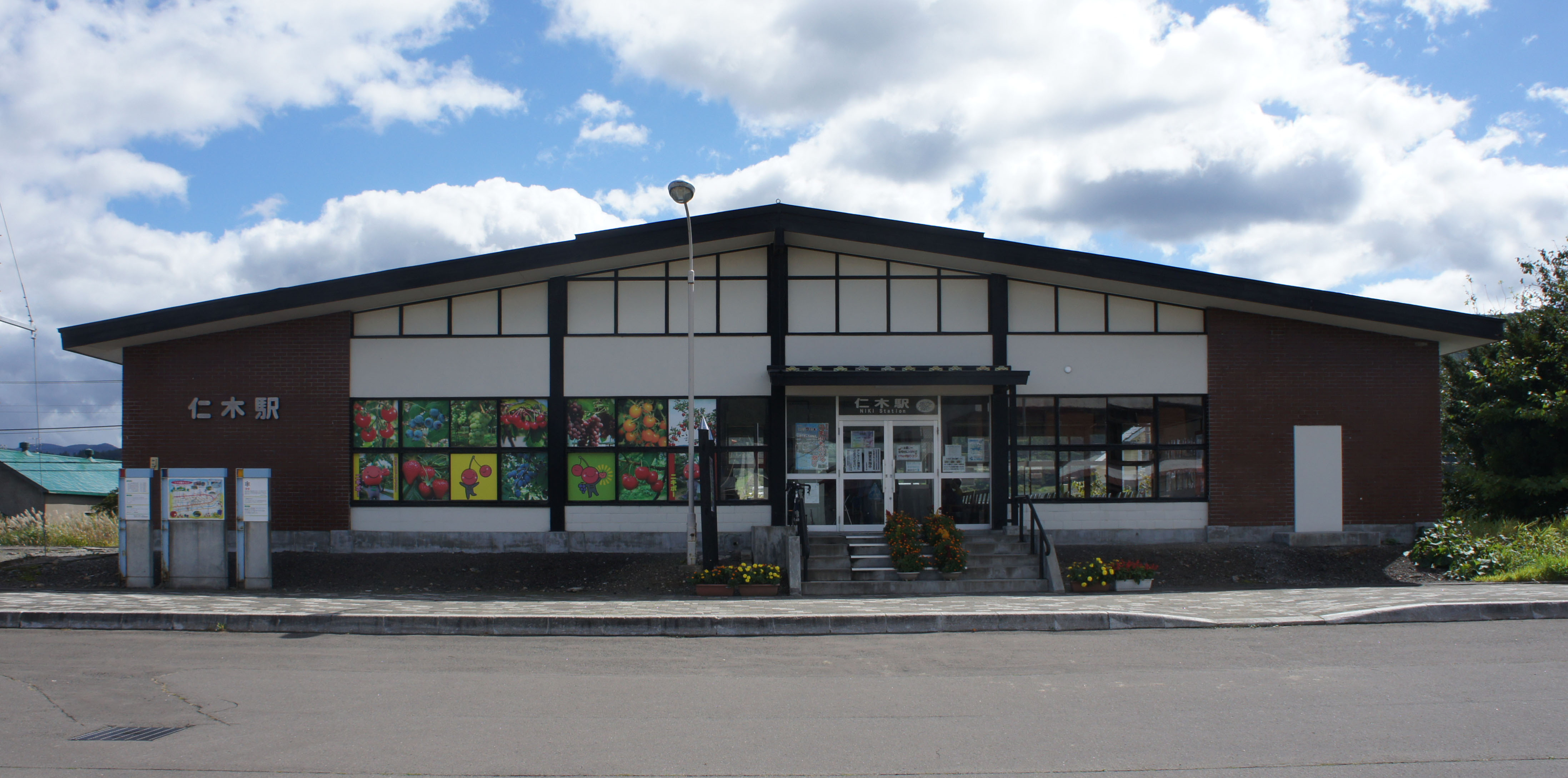
- The station building in September 2018

General information
- Location: Niki, Hokkaido; Japan
- Coordinates: 43°09′14″N 140°46′15″E
- Operator: JR Hokkaido
- Line: ■ Hakodate Main Line
- Distance: 228.2 km from Hakodate
- Platforms: 1 side platform
- Tracks: 1

Construction
- Structure type: At grade

Other information
- Status: Unstaffed
- Station code: S19

History
- Opened: 10 December 1902

Passengers
- FY2013: 87 daily

Services
Preceding station	JR Hokkaido	Following station
Shikaribetsu S20 towards Hakodate	Hakodate Main Line Local	Yoichi S18 towards Asahikawa
Rapid
Shikaribetsu S20 towards Kutchan	Niseko Liner	Yoichi S18 towards Sapporo
Location
- Location within Japan

Niki Station (仁木駅, Niki-eki) is a railway station on the Hakodate Main Line in Niki, Yoichi District, Hokkaido, Japan, operated by Hokkaido Railway Company (JR Hokkaido). The station is numbered "S19".

== Lines ==
Niki Station is served by the Hakodate Main Line and is 228.2 km from the start of the line at Hakodate.

== Station layout ==
The station has a single side platform. Kitaca is not available. The station is unattended.

== History ==
The station opened on 12 December 1902 at an intermediate station on a track which the private Hokkaido Railway had laid down between Ranshima and Shikaribetsu. By 28 June 1903, the track had been extended north from Ranshima to Otaru Chūō (now Otaru). By 19 Oct 1904, link ups to the track south of Shikaribetsu had allowed through traffic all the way to Hakodate. After the Hokkaido Railway was nationalized on 1 July 1907, Japanese Government Railways (JGR) took over control of Yoichi station. On 12 October 1909 the station became part of the Hakodate Main Line. On 1 April 1987, with the privatization of Japanese National Railways (JNR), the successor of JGR, the station came under the control of JR Hokkaido. From 1 October 2007, station numbering was introduced on JR Hokkaido lines, with Niki Station becoming "S19".

== See also ==
- List of railway stations in Japan
