= Yoichi Station =

Railway station in Yoichi, Hokkaido, Japan

Yoichi Station 余市駅
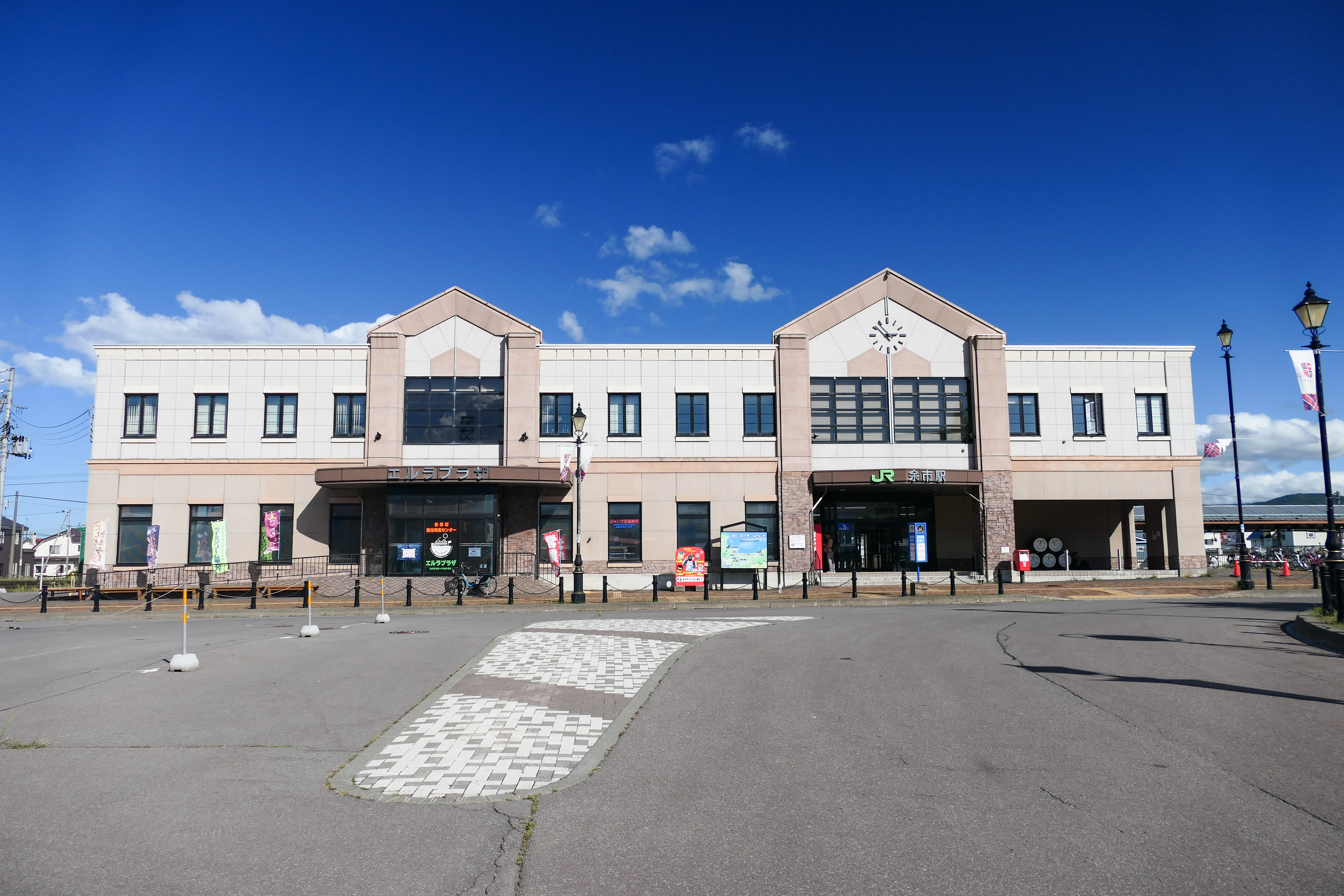
- Yoichi Station in August 2024

General information
- Location: 5-43-7 Kurokawachō, Yoichi-chō, Yoichi-gun, Hokkaido; Japan
- Coordinates: 43°11′12″N 140°47′41″E
- Operator: JR Hokkaido
- Line: ■ Hakodate Main Line
- Distance: 232.6 km from Hakodate
- Platforms: 1 side + 1 island platforms
- Tracks: 3

Other information
- Status: Staffed - JR Hokkaido ticket window (Midori no Madoguchi)
- Station code: S18

History
- Opened: 10 December 1902

Passengers
- FY2013: 621 daily

Services
Preceding station	JR Hokkaido	Following station
Niki S19 towards Hakodate	Hakodate Main Line Local	Ranshima S17 towards Asahikawa
Rapid
Niki S19 towards Kutchan	Niseko Liner	Ranshima S17 towards Sapporo
Location
- Location within Hokkaido Location within Japan

Yoichi Station (余市駅, Yoichi-eki) is a railway station on the Hakodate Main Line in Yoichi, Hokkaido, Japan, operated by Hokkaido Railway Company (JR Hokkaido). The station is numbered "S18".

== Lines ==
Yoichi Station is served by the Hakodate Main Line and is 232.6 km from the start of the line at Hakodate.

When the Hokkaido Shinkansen opens in the spring of 2031, the Hakodate Main Line will be truncated and the section of track between Oshamambe and Otaru will be abolished. In March 2022, after a consultation period, 7 towns along the Hakodate Maine Line between Otaru and Yoichi approved a conversion to a new bus service and a closure of the Hakodate Main Line past Otaru in conjunction with the opening of the Hokkaido Shinkansen in the Spring of 2031.

== Station layout ==
The station has two side platforms connected by a footbridge. The station has a "Midori no Madoguchi" staffed ticket office. JR Hokkaido's contactless smart card ticket Kitaca, is not available at this station.

== History ==
The station opened on 12 December 1902 at an intermediate station on a track which the private Hokkaido Railway had laid down between Ranshima and Shikaribetsu. By 28 June 1903, the track had been extended north from Ranshima to Otaru Chūō (now Otaru). By 19 Oct 1904, link ups to the track south of Shikaribetsu had allowed through traffic all the way to Hakodate. After the Hokkaido Railway was nationalized on 1 July 1907, Japanese Government Railways (JGR) took over control of Yoichi station. On 12 October 1909 the station became part of the Hakodate Main Line. On 1 April 1987, with the privatization of Japanese National Railways (JNR), the successor of JGR, the station came under the control of JR Hokkaido. From 1 October 2007, station numbering was introduced on JR Hokkaido lines, with Yoichi Station becoming "S18".

== See also ==
- List of railway stations in Japan
