= Suttsu =

Suttsu may refer to the following places in Japan:

- Suttsu, Hokkaido, a town
- Suttsu District, Hokkaido
