= Shioya Station (Hokkaido) =

Railway station in Otaru, Hokkaido, Japan

Coordinates: 43°12′09″N 140°55′29″E

Shioya Station 塩谷駅
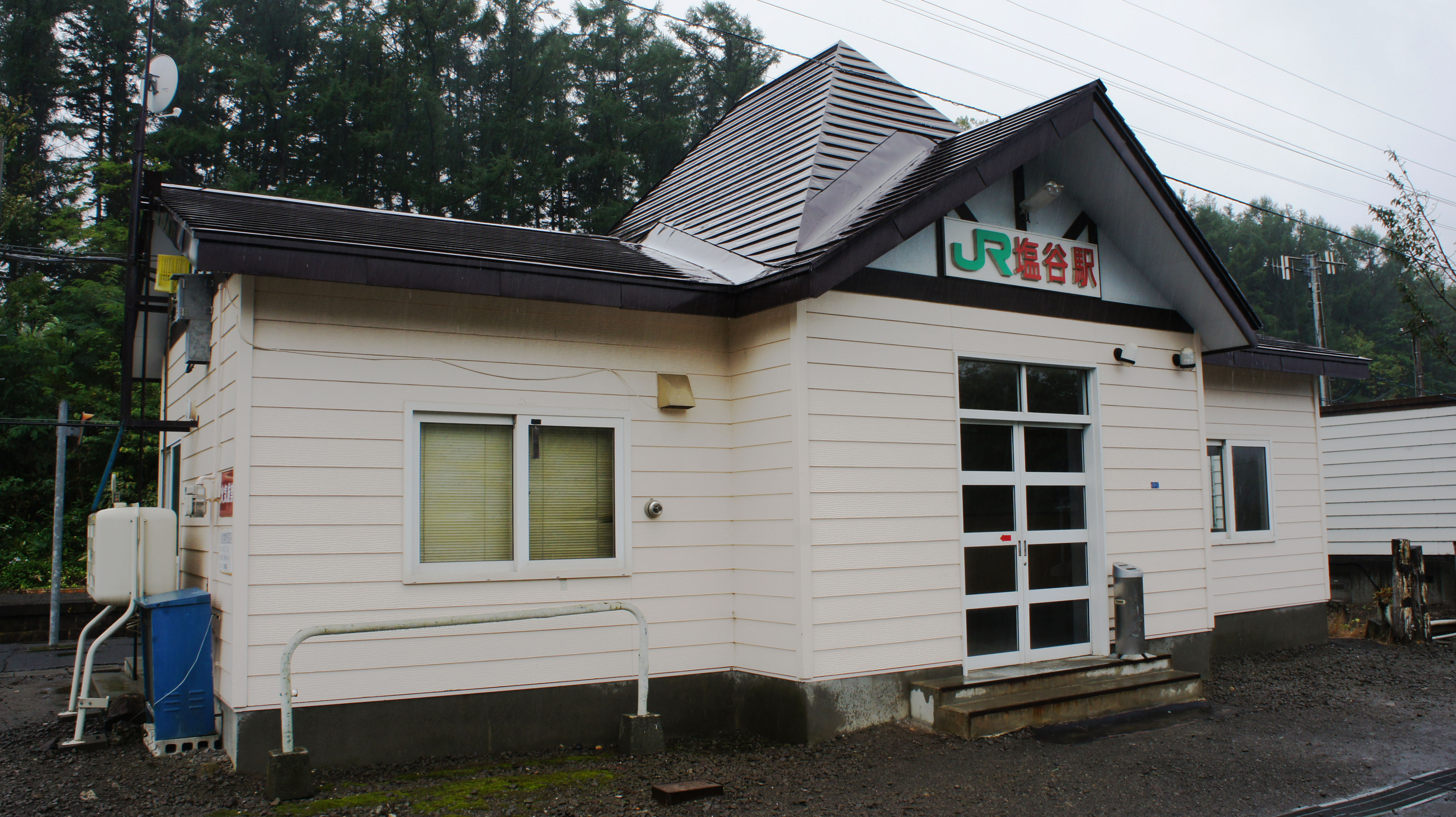
- Station building

General information
- Location: Otaru, Hokkaido, Hokkaido; Japan
- Operator: JR Hokkaido
- Line: ■ Hakodate Main Line
- Distance: 244.8 km from Hakodate
- Platforms: 2 side platforms
- Tracks: 2

Other information
- Status: Unstaffed
- Station code: S16

History
- Opened: June 28, 1903

Passengers
- FY2013: 38 daily
Location

Shioya Station (塩谷駅, Shioya-eki) is a railway station on the Hakodate Main Line in Otaru, Hokkaido, Japan, operated by Hokkaido Railway Company (JR Hokkaido). The station is numbered S16.

== Lines ==
Shioya Station is served by the Hakodate Main Line.

== Station layout ==
The station has two side platforms connected by an overpass. Kitaca is not available. The station is unattended.

=== Platforms ===
1	■ Hakodate Main Line	for Yoichi, Kutchan, and Oshamambe
2	■ Hakodate Main Line	for Otaru and Sapporo

== Adjacent stations ==
«	Service	»
Hakodate Main Line
Ranshima (S17)	Rapid	Otaru (S15)
Ranshima (S17)	Local	Otaru (S15)

== History ==
Shioya Station opened on 28 June 1903.
