= Niseko Station =

Railway station in Niseko, Hokkaido, Japan

Niseko Station ニセコ駅
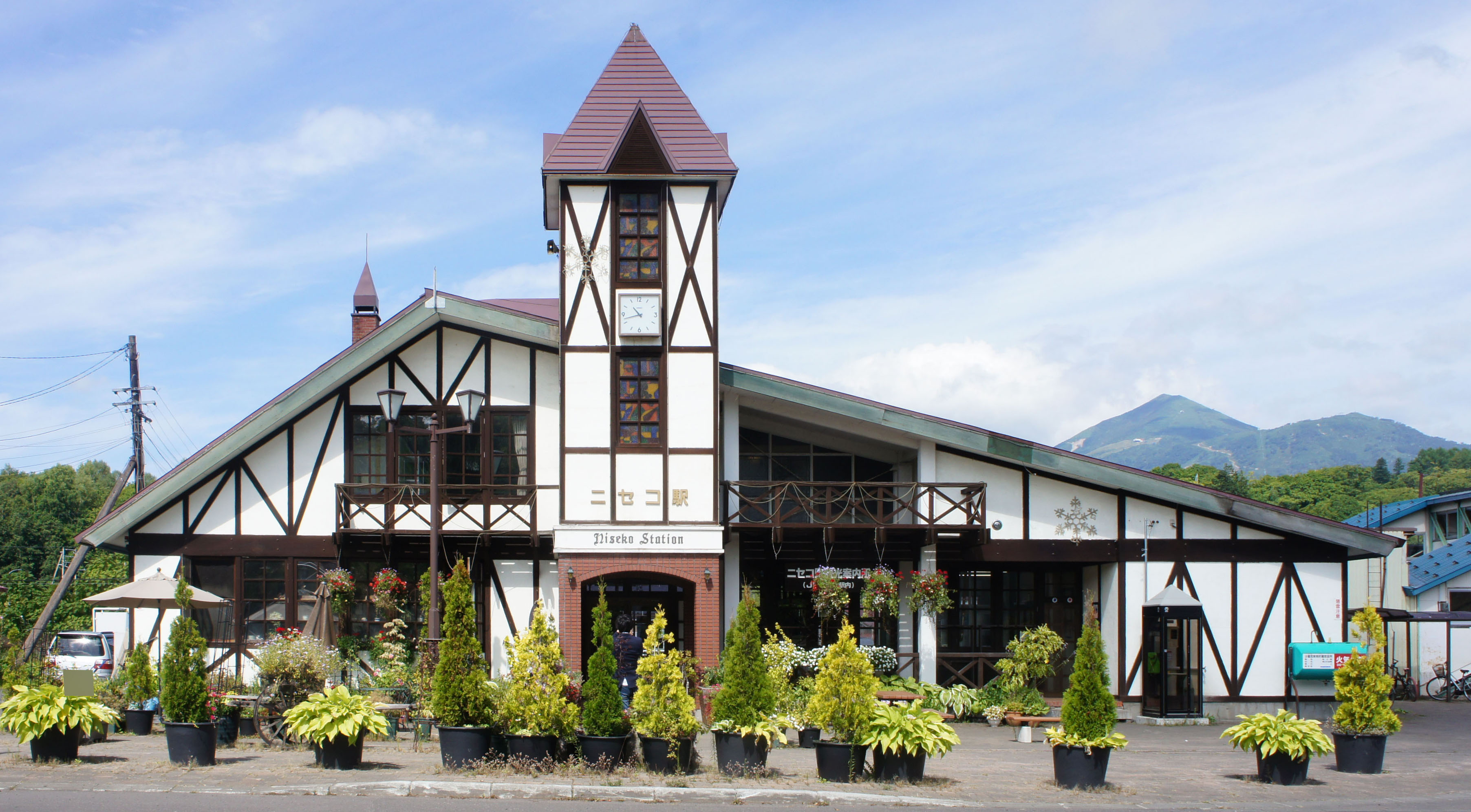
- Station frontage, September 2017

General information
- Location: Chuodori, Niseko; Hokkaido Prefecture; Japan
- Coordinates: 42°48′34″N 140°41′06″E
- Operator: JR Hokkaido
- Line: Hakodate Main Line
- Distance: 179.6 km (111.6 mi) from Hakodate
- Platforms: 2 side platforms
- Tracks: 2

Construction
- Structure type: At grade

Other information
- Station code: S25
- Website: Kan'i itaku ticket window

History
- Opened: 15 October 1904; 122 years ago
- Former names: Makkari (1904-1905); Kaributo (1905-1968)

Services
Preceding station	JR Hokkaido	Following station
Konbu towards Hakodate	Hakodate Main Line Local	Hirafu towards Asahikawa
Konbu One-way operation	Niseko Liner	Hirafu towards Sapporo
Location
- Location within Hokkaido Location within Japan

Niseko Station (ニセコ駅, Niseko-eki) is a railway station on the Hakodate Main Line in Niseko, Hokkaidō, Japan. It is operated by JR Hokkaido and has the station number "S25".

== Lines ==
The station is served by the Hakodate Main Line and is located 179.6 km from the start of the line at Hakodate. Both local and the Rapid Niseko Liner services stop at the station.

== Station layout ==
The station consists of two opposed side platforms serving two tracks at grade. Niseko Station is a simple consignment station, administered by Kutchan Station, and operated by Niseko association of sightseeing. Ordinary tickets, express tickets, and reserved-seat tickets for all JR lines are on sale.(Kan'i itaku station)

=== Platforms ===
1	■Hakodate Main Line	For Oshamanbe and Hakodate
2	■Hakodate Main Line	For Kutchan and Otaru

== History ==
The station was opened on 15 October 1904 by the private Hokkaido Railway as an intermediate station during a phase of expansion when its track from Hakodate to Neppu was extended to link up with stretches of track further north to provide through traffic from Hakodate to Otaru. At that time, its name was Makkari Station (真狩駅, Makkari-eki). On 15 December 1905, its name was changed to Kaributo Station (狩太駅, Kaributo-eki). After the Hokkaido Railway was nationalized on 1 July 1907, Japanese Government Railways (JGR) took over control of the station. On 12 October 1909 the station became part of the Hakodate Main Line. On 1 April 1968, Japanese National Railways (JNR), the successor of JGR, renamed the station to Niseko. With the privatization of JNR on 1 April 1987, control of the station passed to JR Hokkaido.

== Surrounding area ==
- Niseko town office
- Niseko-Ekimae Post office
- Niseko Post office

== See also ==
- List of railway stations in Japan
