= Rankoshi Station =

Railway station in Rankoshi, Hokkaido, Japan

S27 Rankoshi Station 蘭越駅
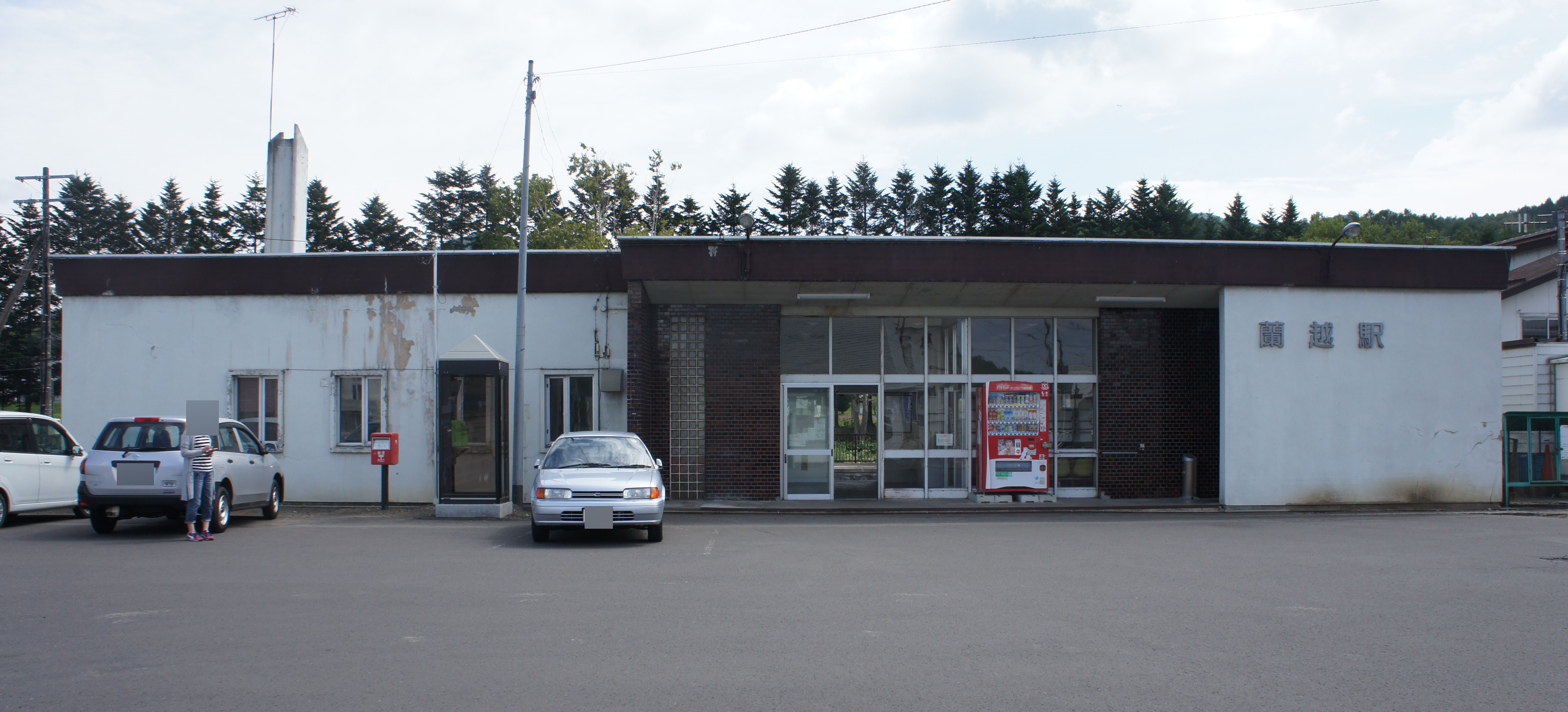
- Rankoshi Station in September 2017

General information
- Location: 853 Rankoshi, Isoya; Hokkaido Prefecture; Japan
- Coordinates: 42°48′14″N 140°31′43″E
- Operator: JR Hokkaido
- Line: Hakodate Main Line
- Distance: 163.4 km (101.5 mi) from Hakodate
- Platforms: 2 side platforms
- Tracks: 2

Construction
- Structure type: At grade

Other information
- Station code: S27

History
- Opened: 15 October 1904; 122 years ago

Services
Preceding station	JR Hokkaido	Following station
Mena S28 towards Hakodate	Hakodate Main Line Local	Konbu S26 towards Asahikawa
Rapid
Terminus	Niseko Liner	Konbu S26 towards Sapporo
Location
- Location within Hokkaido Location within Japan

Rankoshi Station (蘭越駅, Rankoshi-eki) is a railway station on the Hakodate Main Line in Rankoshi, Hokkaido, Japan, operated by the Hokkaido Railway Company (JR Hokkaido). It is numbered "S27".

== Lines ==
The station is served by the Hakodate Main Line and is located 163.4 km from the start of the line at Hakodate. Besides local trains, the Rapid Niseko Liner for Sapporo begins its run from the station.

== Station layout ==
The station consists of two opposed side platforms serving two tracks. It is operated by Rankoshi municipal authority. Ordinary tickets, express tickets, and reserved-seat tickets for all JR lines are on sale.

=== Platforms ===
1	■ Hakodate Main Line	for Kutchan and Otaru
2	■ Hakodate Main Line	for Oshamambe and Hakodate

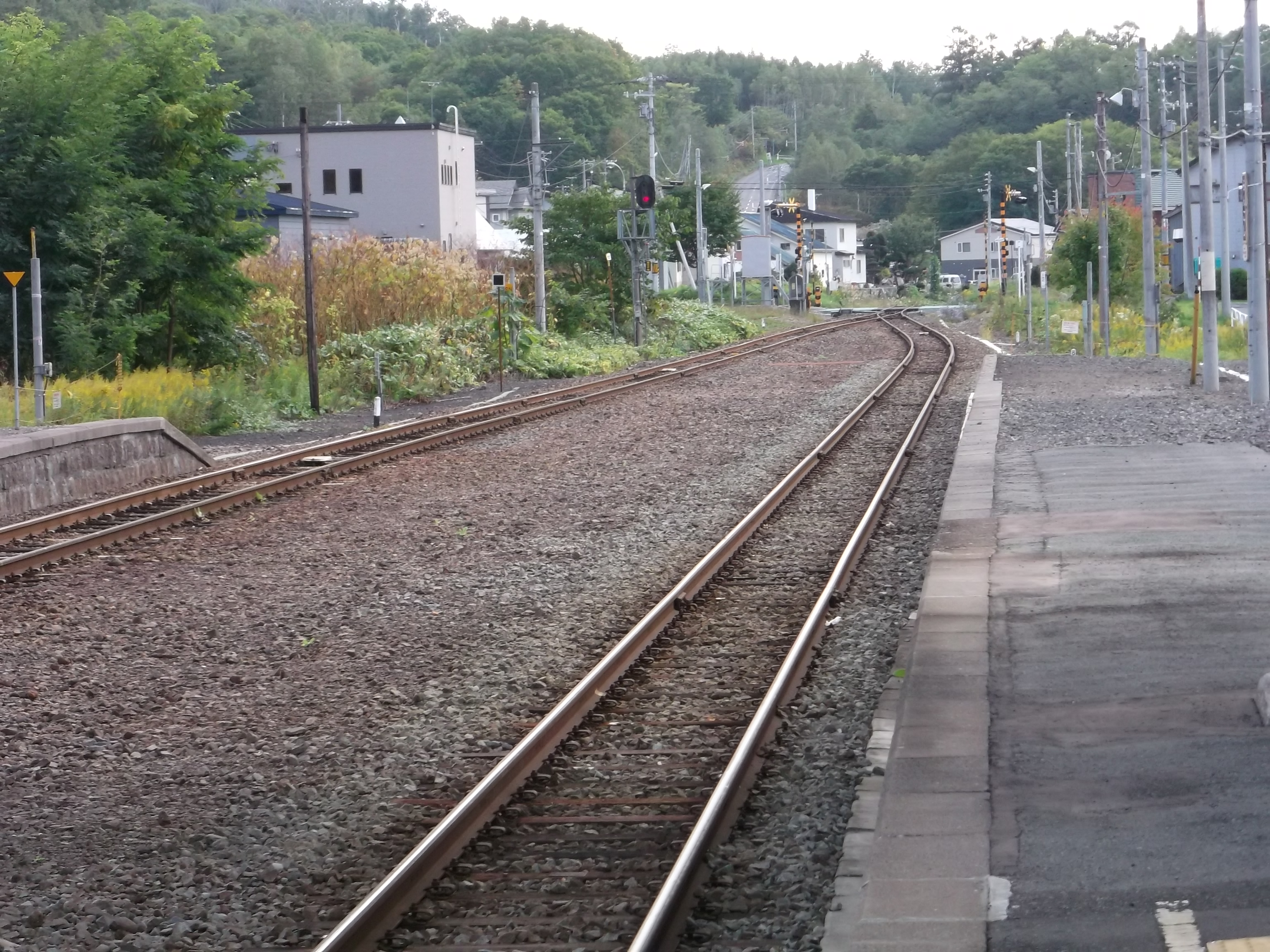
The view from the platform looking toward Mena, September 2013

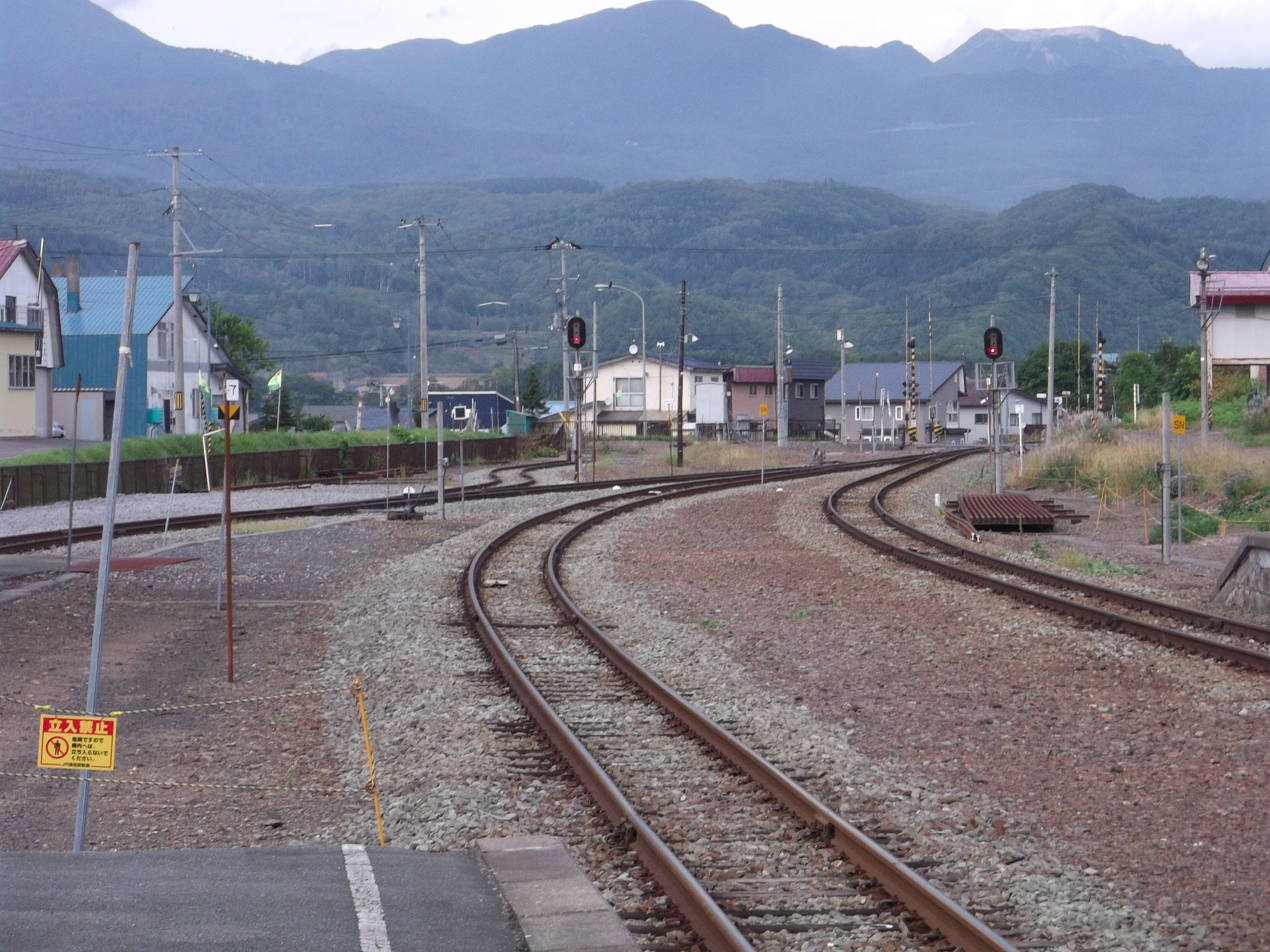
The view from the platform looking toward Konbu, September 2013

== History ==
The station was opened on 15 October 1904 by the private Hokkaido Railway as an intermediate station during a phase of expansion when its track from Hakodate to Neppu was extended to link up with stretches of track further north to provide through traffic from Hakodate to Otaru. After the Hokkaido Railway was nationalized on 1 July 1907, Japanese Government Railways (JGR) took over control of the station. On 12 October 1909 the station became part of the Hakodate Main Line. On 1 April 1987, with the privatization of Japanese National Railways (JNR), the successor of JGR, the station came under the control of JR Hokkaido. From 1 October 2007, station numbering was introduced on JR Hokkaido lines, with Rankoshi Station becoming "S27".

== Surrounding area ==
- National Route 5
- Rankoshi town office
- Rankoshi post office

== See also ==
- List of railway stations in Japan
