= Kuromatsunai Station =

Railway station in Kuromatsunai, Hokkaido, Japan

S30 Kuromatsunai Station 黒松内駅
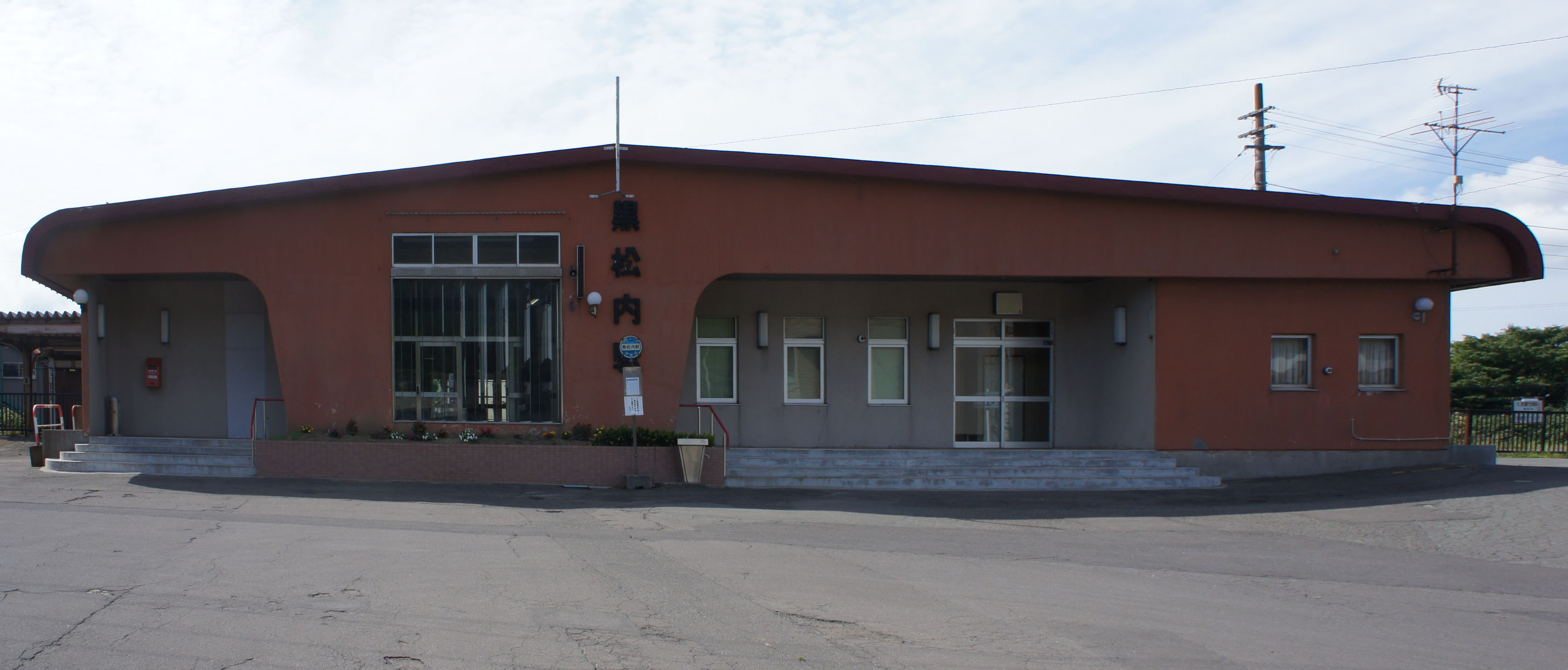
- The station building in September 2017

General information
- Location: Aza Kuromatsunai, Kuromatsunai, Suttsu, Hokkaido （北海道寿都郡黒松内町字黒松内） Japan
- Coordinates: 42°40′11″N 140°18′21″E
- Operator: JR Hokkaido
- Line: Hakodate Main Line
- Connections: Bus stop

Other information
- Station code: S30

History
- Opened: 1903

Services
Preceding station	JR Hokkaido	Following station
Oshamanbe H47 towards Hakodate	Hakodate Main Line	Neppu S29 towards Asahikawa
Location

Kuromatsunai Station (黒松内駅, Kuromatsunai-eki) is a railway station in Kuromatsunai, Suttsu District, Hokkaidō, Japan. It is numbered S30.

== Lines ==
Kuromatsunai Station is served by the Hakodate Main Line.

== Layout ==
Kuromatsunai Station has a single side platform (platform 1) and an island platform (platform 2,3) connected by an overpass.

=== Platforms ===
Platforms

1	■Hakodate Main Line	For Oshamambe
2	■Hakodate Main Line	For Kutchan, Otaru and Sapporo
3	■Hakodate Main Line	Special platform

== History ==
=== Future plans ===
After the Hokkaido Shinkansen is extended to Sapporo, this station is expected to be permanently closed.

== Surrounding area ==
- Kuromatsunai Town Ofiice
- Kuromatsunai Onsen
- Niseko Bus "Kuromatsunai Station" Bus Stop
