= Hirafu Station =

Railway station in Kutchan, Hokkaido, Japan

Hirafu Station 比羅夫駅
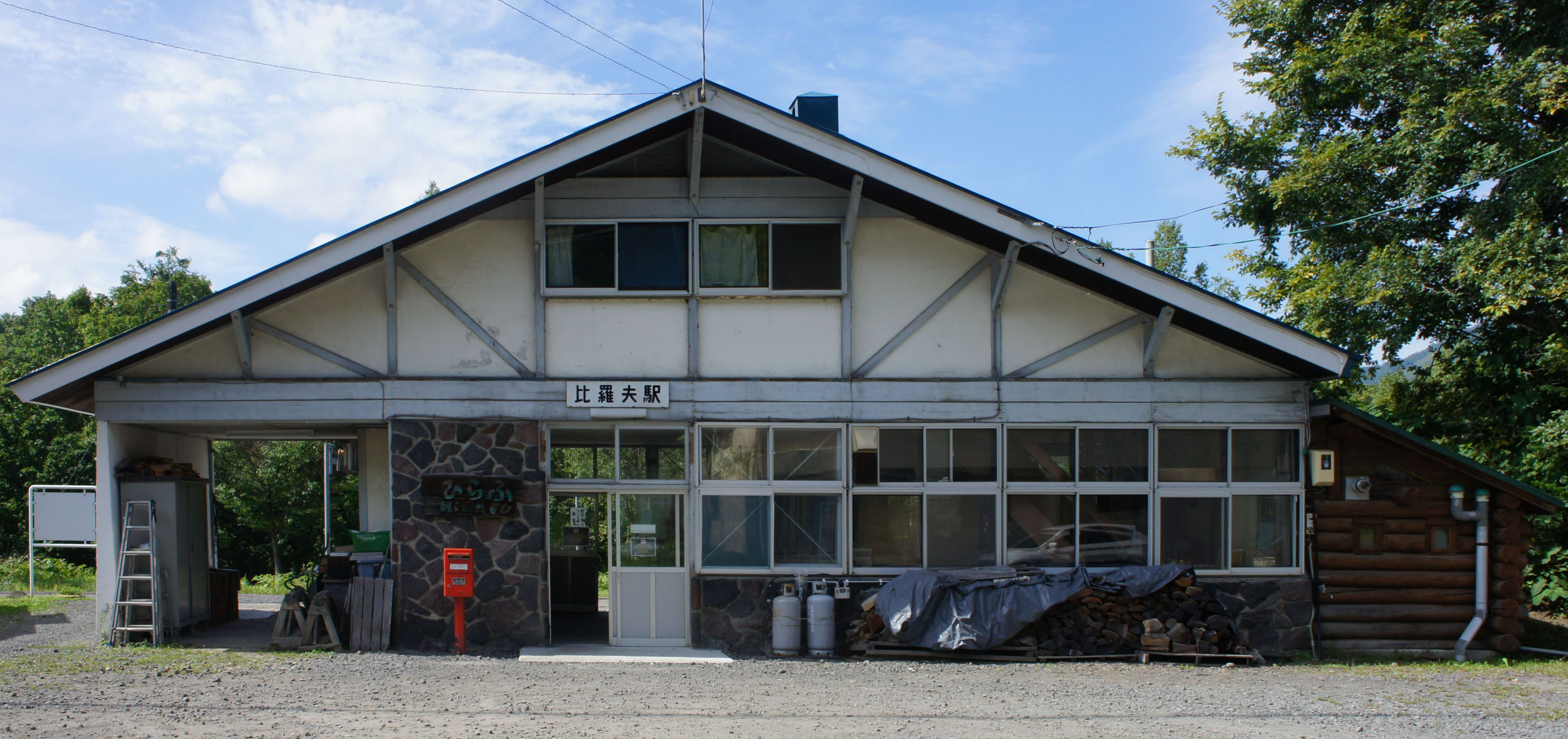
- Hirafu Station in 2017

General information
- Location: Japan
- Coordinates: 42°50′55″N 140°43′20″E
- Operator: JR Hokkaido
- Line: Hakodate Main Line
- Distance: 186.6 km (115.9 mi) from Hakodate
- Platforms: 1 side platform
- Tracks: 1

Construction
- Structure type: At grade

Other information
- Status: Unstaffed
- Station code: S24

History
- Opened: 15 October 1904; 122 years ago

Services
Preceding station	JR Hokkaido	Following station
Niseko towards Hakodate	Hakodate Main Line Local	Kutchan towards Asahikawa
Rapid
Niseko One-way operation	Niseko Liner	Kutchan towards Sapporo
Location
- Location within Hokkaido Location within Japan

Hirafu Station (比羅夫駅, Hirafu-eki) is a railway station on the Hakodate Main Line in Kutchan, Hokkaido, Hokkaido, Japan. It is operated by JR Hokkaido and has the station number "S24".

== Lines ==
The station is served by the Hakodate Main Line and is located 186.6 km from the start of the line at Hakodate. Both local and the Rapid Niseko Liner services stop at the station.

== Station layout ==
The station consists of a side platform serving a single track.

=== Platforms ===
1	■ Hakodate Main Line	for Oshamambe, Kutchan, Otaru, and Sapporo

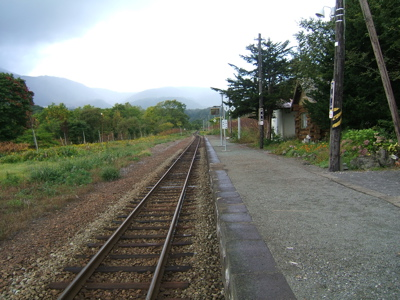
The platform in October 2005

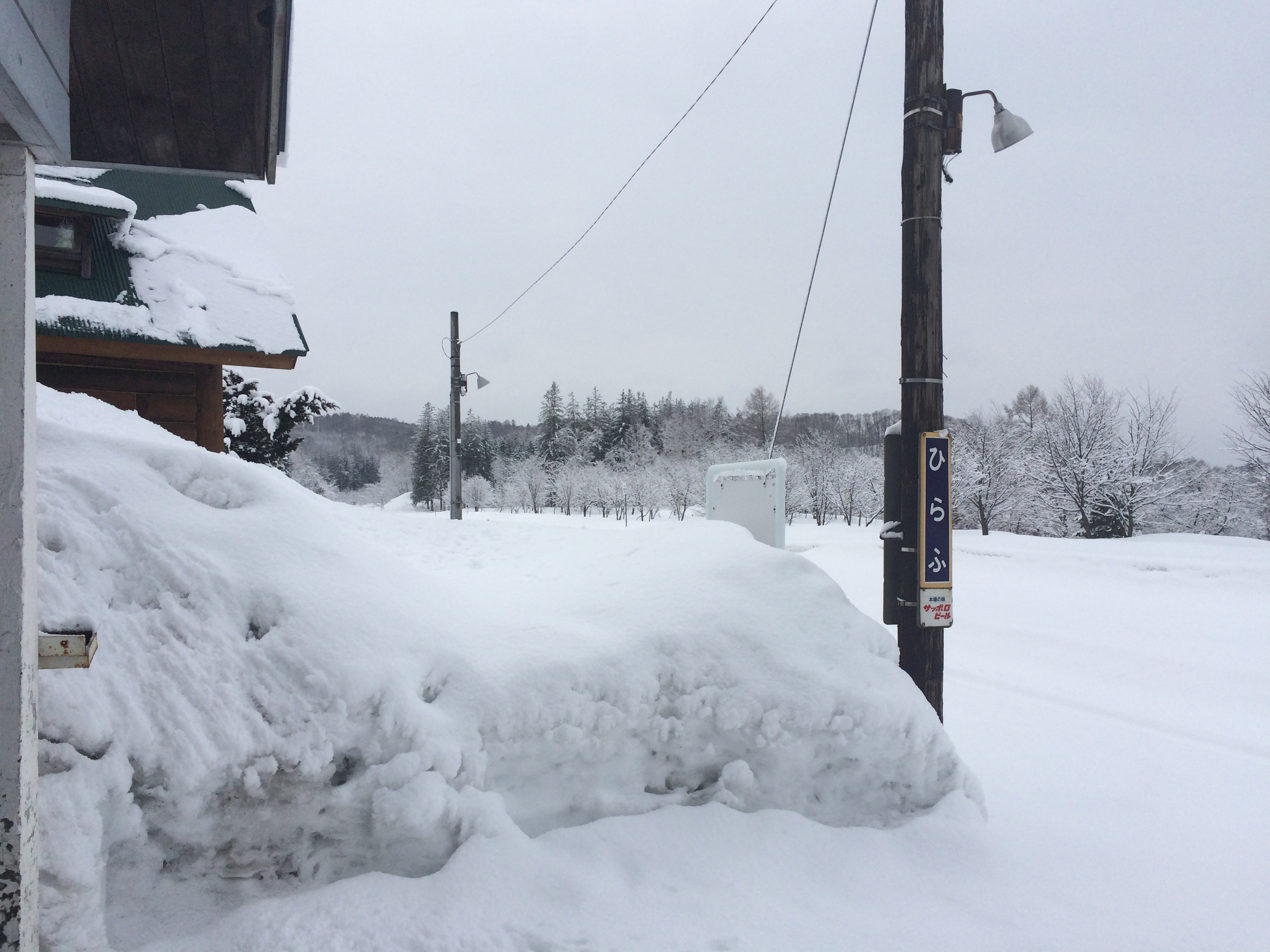
View of the platform under snow in March 2015

== History ==
The station was opened on 15 October 1904 by the private Hokkaido Railway as an intermediate station during a phase of expansion when its track from Hakodate to Neppu was extended to link up with stretches of track further north to provide through traffic from Hakodate to Otaru. After the Hokkaido Railway was nationalized on 1 July 1907, Japanese Government Railways (JGR) took over control of the station. On 12 October 1909 the station became part of the Hakodate Main Line. On 1 April 1987, with the privatization of Japanese National Railways (JNR), the successor of JGR, control of the station passed to JR Hokkaido.

=== Future plans ===
In June 2023, this station was selected to be among 42 stations on the JR Hokkaido network to be slated for abolition owing to low ridership.

== See also ==
- List of railway stations in Japan
