= Konbu Station =

Railway station in Rankoshi, Hokkaido, Japan

Konbu Station 昆布駅
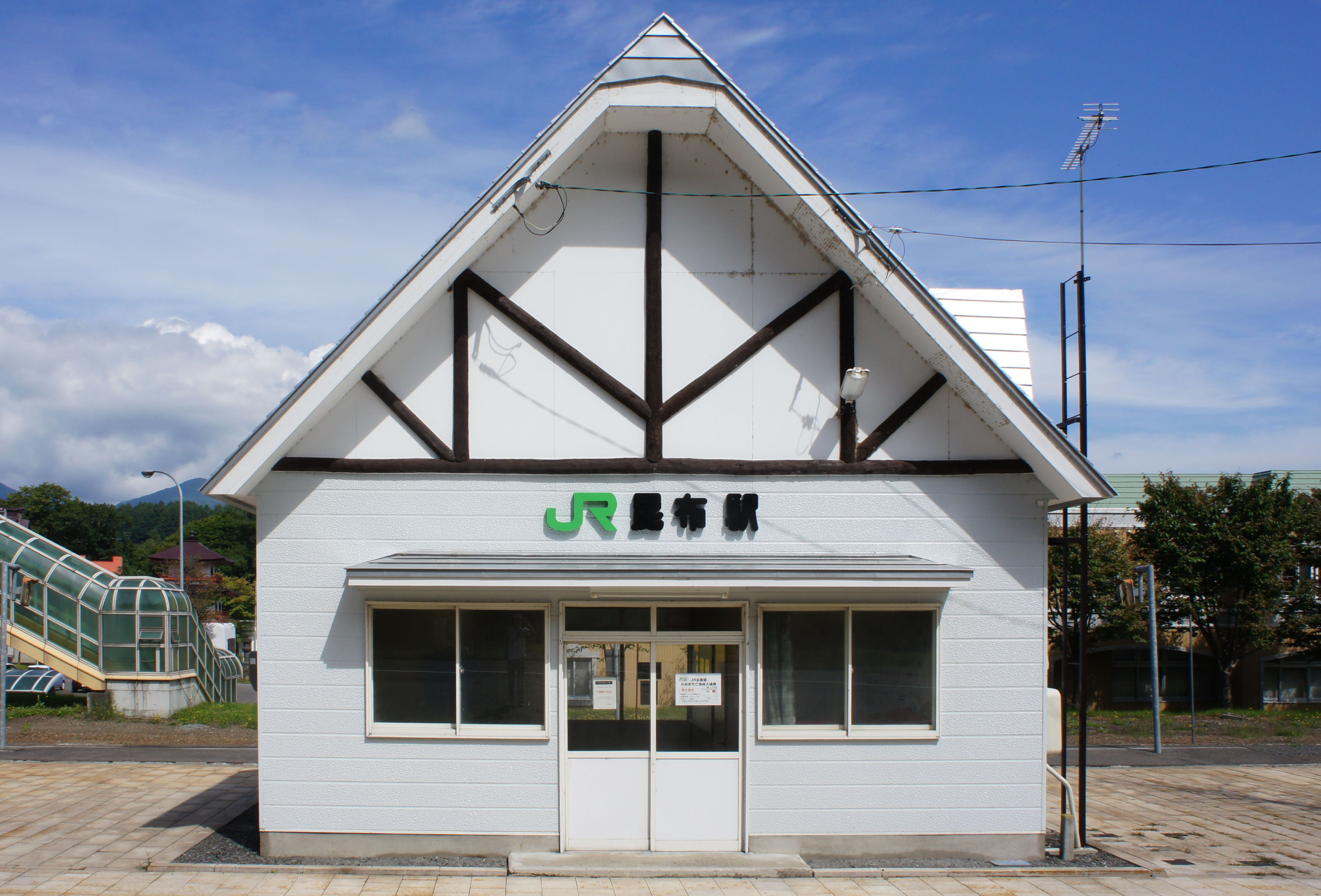
- Konbu Station in 2017

General information
- Location: Japan
- Coordinates: 42.7978°N 140.5960°E
- Operator: JR Hokkaido
- Line: Hakodate Main Line
- Distance: 170.3 km (105.8 mi) from Hakodate
- Platforms: 1 side platform
- Tracks: 1

Construction
- Structure type: At grade

Other information
- Station code: S26
- Website: Unstaffed

History
- Opened: 15 October 1904; 122 years ago

Services
Preceding station	JR Hokkaido	Following station
Rankoshi towards Hakodate	Hakodate Main Line	Niseko towards Asahikawa
Rapid
Rankoshi One-way operation	Niseko Liner	Niseko towards Sapporo
Location
- Location within Hokkaido Location within Japan

Konbu Station (昆布駅, Konbu-eki) is a railway station in Rankoshi, Isoya District, Hokkaidō, Japan. It is operated by JR Hokkaido and has the station number "S26". The station name is sometimes transliterated on railway maps, station name plate and timetables as "Kombu Station".

== Lines ==
The station is served by the Hakodate Main Line and is located 170.3 km from the start of the line at Hakodate. Both local and the Rapid Niseko Liner services stop at the station.

== Station layout ==
The station consists of a side platform serving a single track.

== History ==
The station was opened on 15 October 1904 by the private Hokkaido Railway as an intermediate station during a phase of expansion when its track from Hakodate to Neppu was extended to link up with stretches of track further north to provide through traffic from Hakodate to Otaru. On 1 April 1987, with the privatization of Japanese National Railways (JNR), the successor of JGR, control of the station passed to JR Hokkaido.

== See also ==
- List of railway stations in Japan
