= Ginzan Station =

Railway station in Niki, Hokkaido, Japan

Ginzan Station 銀山駅
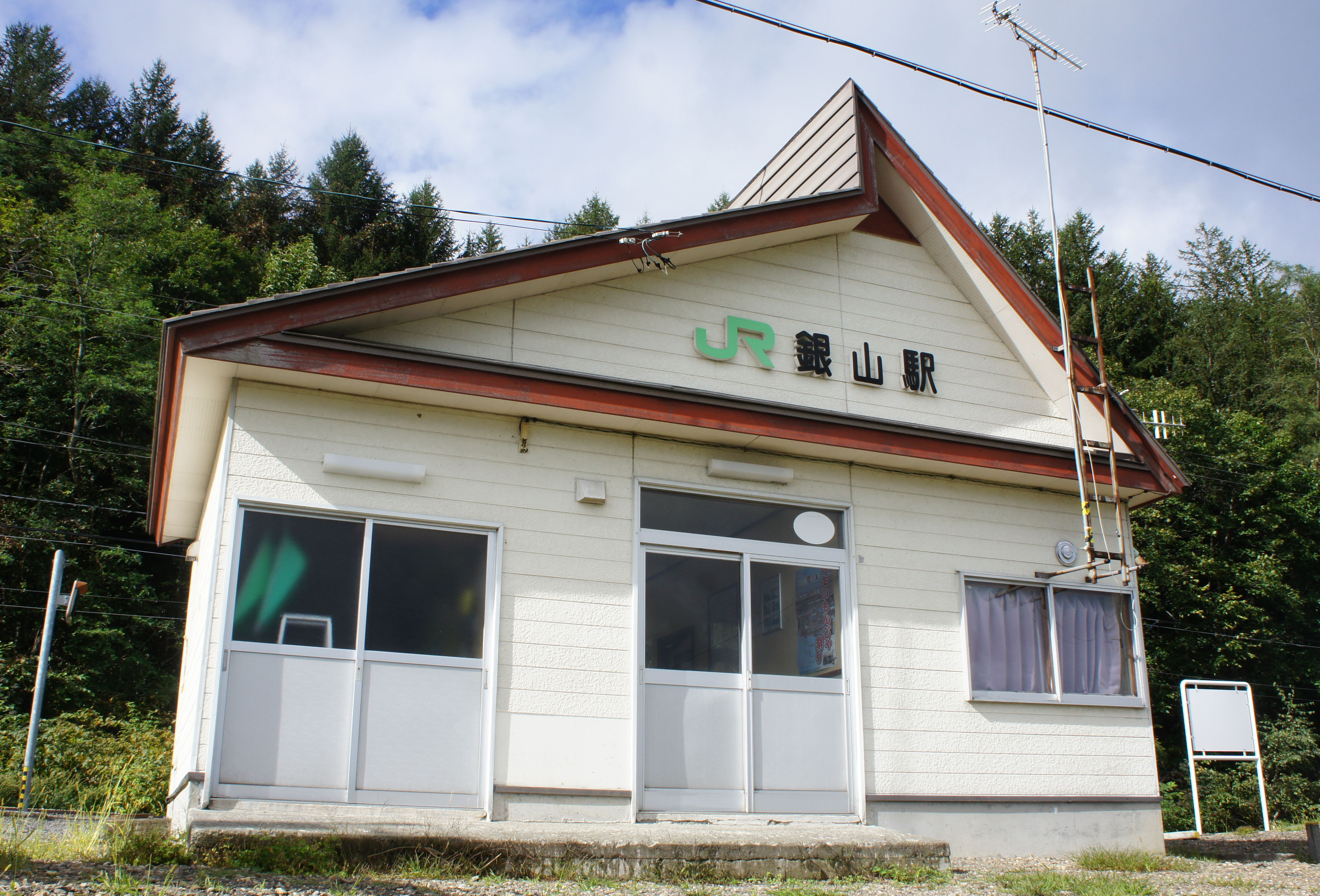
- Ginzan Station in September 2018

General information
- Location: Niki, Hokkaido, Hokkaido; Japan
- Coordinates: 43°02′25″N 140°42′55″E
- Operator: JR Hokkaido
- Line: ■ Hakodate Main Line
- Distance: 213.4 km from Hakodate
- Platforms: 2 side platforms
- Tracks: 2

Other information
- Status: Unstaffed
- Station code: S21

History
- Opened: January 29, 1905
Location

Ginzan Station (銀山駅, Ginzan-eki) is a railway station in Niki, Hokkaidō, Hokkaidō, Japan. It is operated by JR Hokkaido and has the station number "S21".

== Lines ==
Ginzan Station is served by the Hakodate Main Line and is 213.4 km from the start of the line at Hakodate.

== Station layout ==
The station has two side platforms serving two tracks, connected by a rail crossing.

=== Platforms ===
1	■ Hakodate Main Line	for Kutchan and Oshamambe
2	■ Hakodate Main Line	for Otaru and Sapporo

== Adjacent stations ==
«	Service	»
Hakodate Main Line
Kozawa	Rapid	Shikaribetsu
Kozawa	Local	Shikaribetsu

== History ==
The private Hokkaido Railway opened Ginzan Station on 29 January 1905 as an added station on a track which had been established between Hakodate and Otaru. After the Hokkaido Railway was nationalized on 1 July 1907, Japanese Government Railways (JGR) took over control of the station. On 12 October 1909 the station became part of the Hakodate Main Line. On 1 April 1987, with the privatization of Japanese National Railways (JNR), the successor of JGR, the station came under the control of JR Hokkaido. From 1 October 2007, station numbering was introduced on JR Hokkaido lines, with Ginzan Station becoming "S21".
