= Mena Station =

Railway station in Rankoshi, Hokkaido, Japan

Coordinates: 42.7615°N 140.4655°E

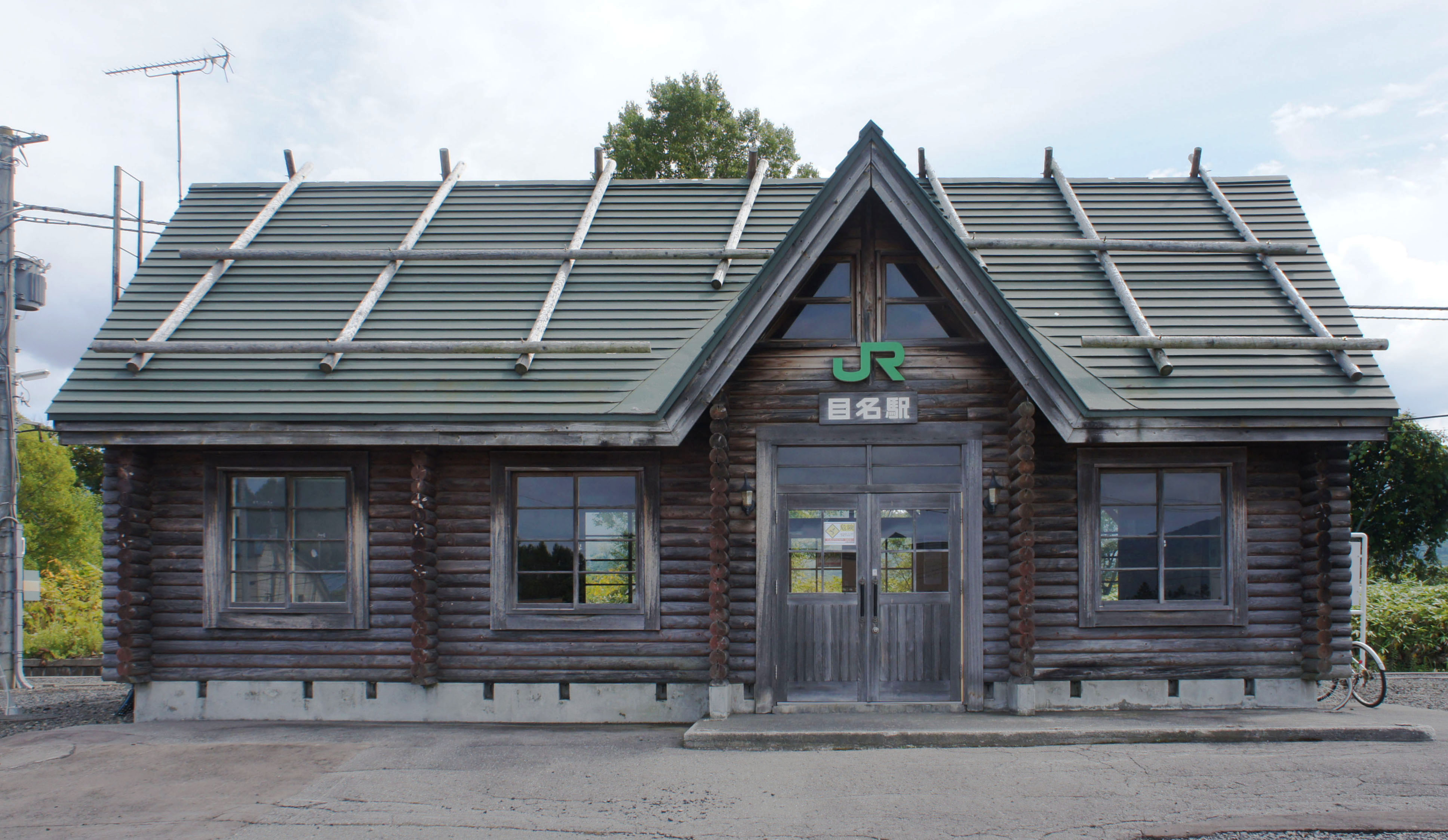
Station building

Mena Station (目名駅, Mena-eki) is a railway station in Rankoshi, Isoya District, Hokkaidō, Japan.

== Lines ==
- Hokkaido Railway Company
  - Hakodate Main Line Station S28

== History ==
=== Future plans ===
In June 2023, this station was selected to be among 42 stations on the JR Hokkaido network to be slated for abolition owing to low ridership.

== Adjacent stations ==
«	Service	»
Hakodate Main Line
Neppu	Local	Rankoshi
