= Shikaribetsu Station =

Railway station in Niki, Hokkaido, Japan

S20 Shikaribetsu Station 然別駅
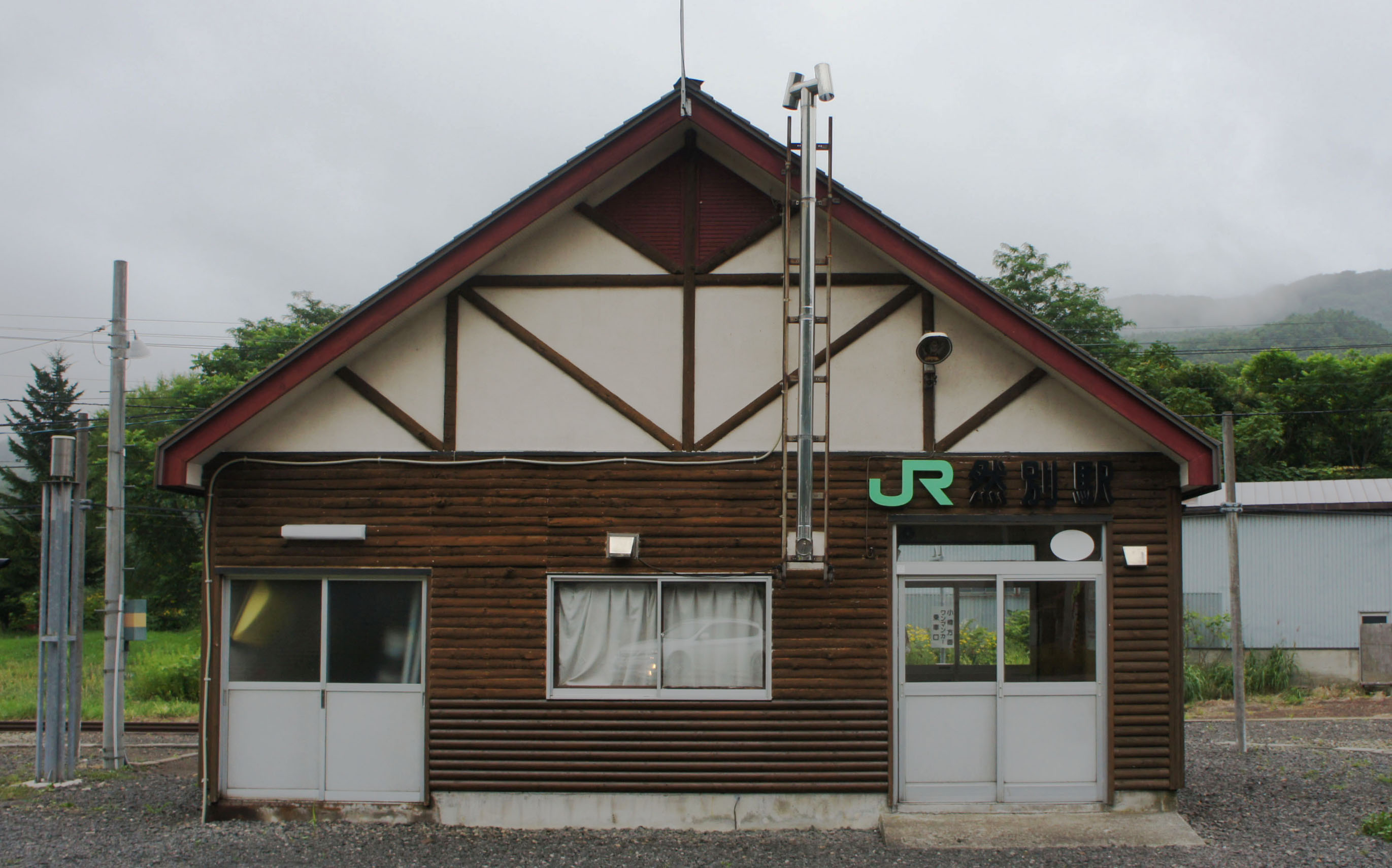
- Station building, August 2017

General information
- Location: Niki, Hokkaido, Hokkaido; Japan
- Coordinates: 43°07′31″N 140°44′13″E
- Operator: JR Hokkaido
- Line: ■ Hakodate Main Line
- Distance: 224.1 km from Hakodate
- Platforms: 2 side platforms
- Tracks: 2

Other information
- Status: Unstaffed
- Station code: S20

History
- Opened: 10 December 1902

Passengers
- FY2013: 14 daily

Services
Preceding station	JR Hokkaido	Following station
Ginzan S21 towards Hakodate	Hakodate Main Line Local	Niki S19 towards Asahikawa
Rapid
Ginzan S21 towards Kutchan	Niseko Liner	Niki S19 towards Sapporo
Location

Shikaribetsu Station (然別駅, Shikaribetsu-eki) is a train station in Niki, Yoichi District, Hokkaidō, Japan. The station is numbered S20.

== Lines ==
Shikaribetsu Station is served by the Hakodate Main Line and is 224.1 km from the start of the line at Hakodate.

== Station layout ==
The station has two ground-level opposed side platforms serving two tracks. Kitaca is not available. The station is unattended.

== History ==
Shikaribetsu Station opened on 12 December 1902 when the private Hokkaido Railway established a track between it and Ranshima. By 28 June 1903, the track had been extended north from Ranshima to Otaru Chūō (now Otaru). By 19 Oct 1904, link ups to the track south of Shikaribetsu had allowed through traffic all the way to Hakodate. After the Hokkaido Railway was nationalized on 1 July 1907, Japanese Government Railways (JGR) took over control of the station. On 12 October 1909 the station became part of the Hakodate Main Line. On 1 April 1987, with the privatization of Japanese National Railways (JNR), the successor of JGR, the station came under the control of JR Hokkaido. From 1 October 2007, station numbering was introduced on JR Hokkaido lines, with Shikaribetsu Station becoming "S20".
