= Akaigawa, Hokkaido =

Akaigawa 赤井川村
- Village
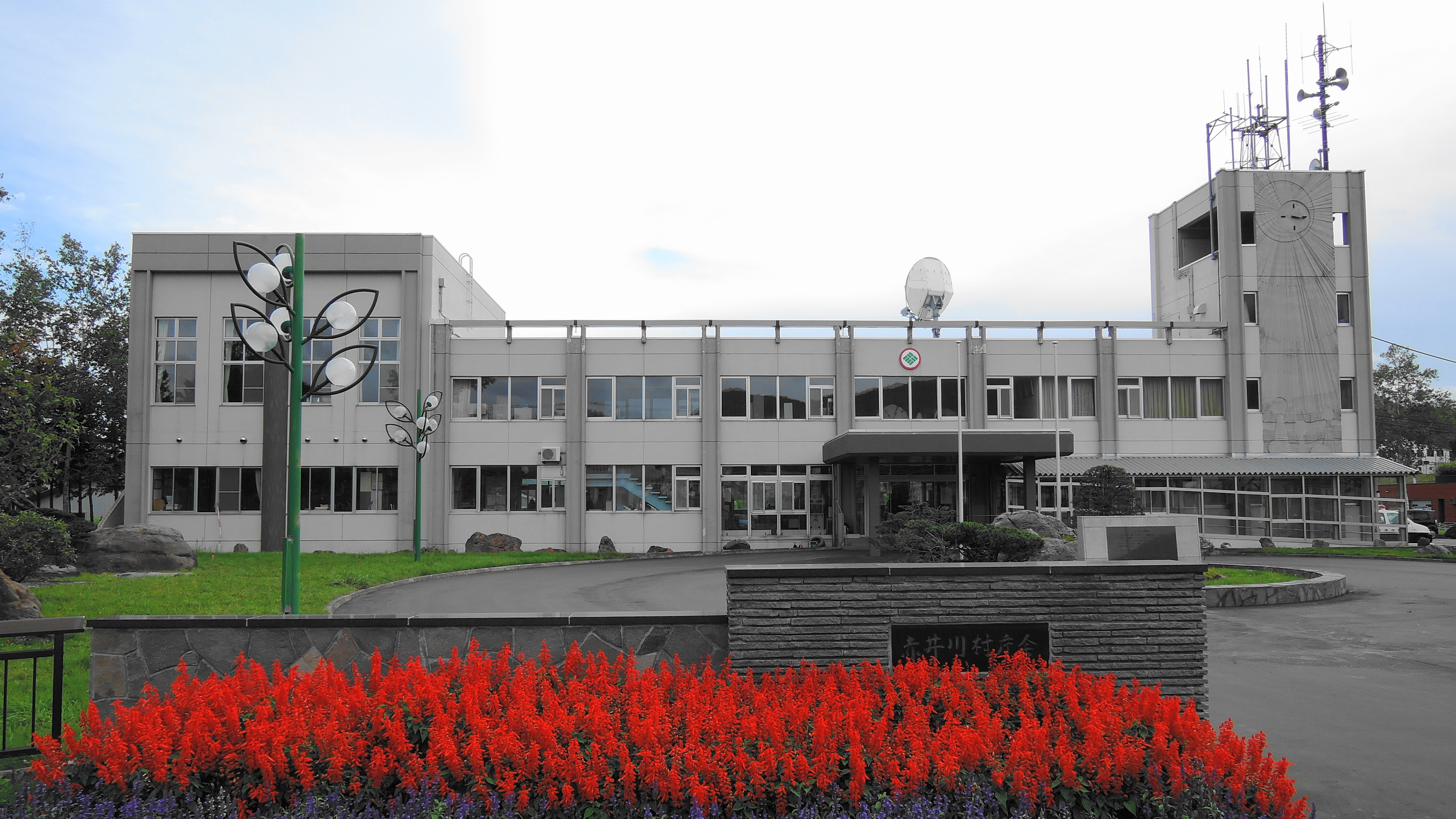
- Akaigawa Village hall

- Flag Emblem

- Location of Akaigawa in Hokkaido (Shiribeshi Subprefecture)

- Location in Japan
- Coordinates: 43°5′N 140°49′E
- Country: Japan
- Region: Hokkaido
- Prefecture: Hokkaido (Shiribeshi Subprefecture)
- District: Yoichi

Government
  - Mayor: Motomu Baba

Area
  - Total: 280.11 km^{2} (108.15 sq mi)

Population (October 1, 2020)
  - Total: 1,165
  - Density: 4.159/km^{2} (10.77/sq mi)
- Time zone: UTC+09:00 (JST)
- City hall address: 74-2 Akaigawa, Akaigawa, Yoichi-gun, Hokkaido; 046-0592
- Website: www.akaigawa.com
- Symbols
- Flower: Murasaki-yashio
- Mascot: Akarin (あかりん)
- Tree: Betula pendula

Akaigawa (赤井川村, Akaigawa-mura) is a village located in Shiribeshi, Hokkaido, Japan.

As of October 2020, the village has an estimated population of 1,165. The total area is 280.11 km^{2}.

== History ==
The name derives from Ainu word "hure-pet", meaning "red river".

- 1899: Akaigawa Village split off from Ōe Village (now Niki Town).
- 1906: Akaigawa became a Second Class Village.
- 1991: Kiroro Resort opened.

== Geography ==
The center of Akaigawa is in the Akaigawa Caldera and surrounded by mountains on every side.

Kiroro Resort is on the eastern side of the village.

- Mountains: Mount Yoichi, Mount Ponkuto
- Rivers: Yoichi River, Shiroigawa River, Akaigawa River

=== Neighboring cities and towns ===
- Kutchan
- Kyōgoku
- Minami-ku, Sapporo
- Niki
- Otaru
- Yoichi

== Demographics ==
Per Japanese census data, the population of Akaigawa has declined in recent decades.

Historical population
Year	Pop.	±%
2000	1,512	—
2010	1,262	−16.5%
2020	1,165	−7.7%

== Education ==
- Akaigawa Village Board Of Education
  - Akaigawa Elementary School
  - Akaigawa Junior High School
  - Miyako Elementary School
