= Kuromatsunai Shindō =

Road in Hokkaido, Japan

Kuromatsunai Shindō
- 黒松内新道
- The Kuromatsunai Shindō highlighted in red

Route information
- Maintained by Ministry of Land, Infrastructure, Transport and Tourism
- Length: 5.1 km (3.2 mi)
- Existed: 2009–present
- Component highways: National Route 5

Major junctions
- East end: Kuromatsunai Junction; Dō-Ō Expressway in Kuromatsunai
- West end: Kuromatsunai Interchange; National Route 5 in Kuromatsunai

Location
- Country: Japan

Highway system
- National highways of Japan; Expressways of Japan

The Kuromatsunai Shindō (黒松内新道) is a 5.1-kilometer-long (3.2 mi) spur route of the Dō-Ō Expressway in Kuromatsunai, Hokkaido. It is owned and operated by Ministry of Land, Infrastructure, Transport and Tourism and is numbered E5A under their "2016 Proposal for Realization of Expressway Numbering".

== Route description ==
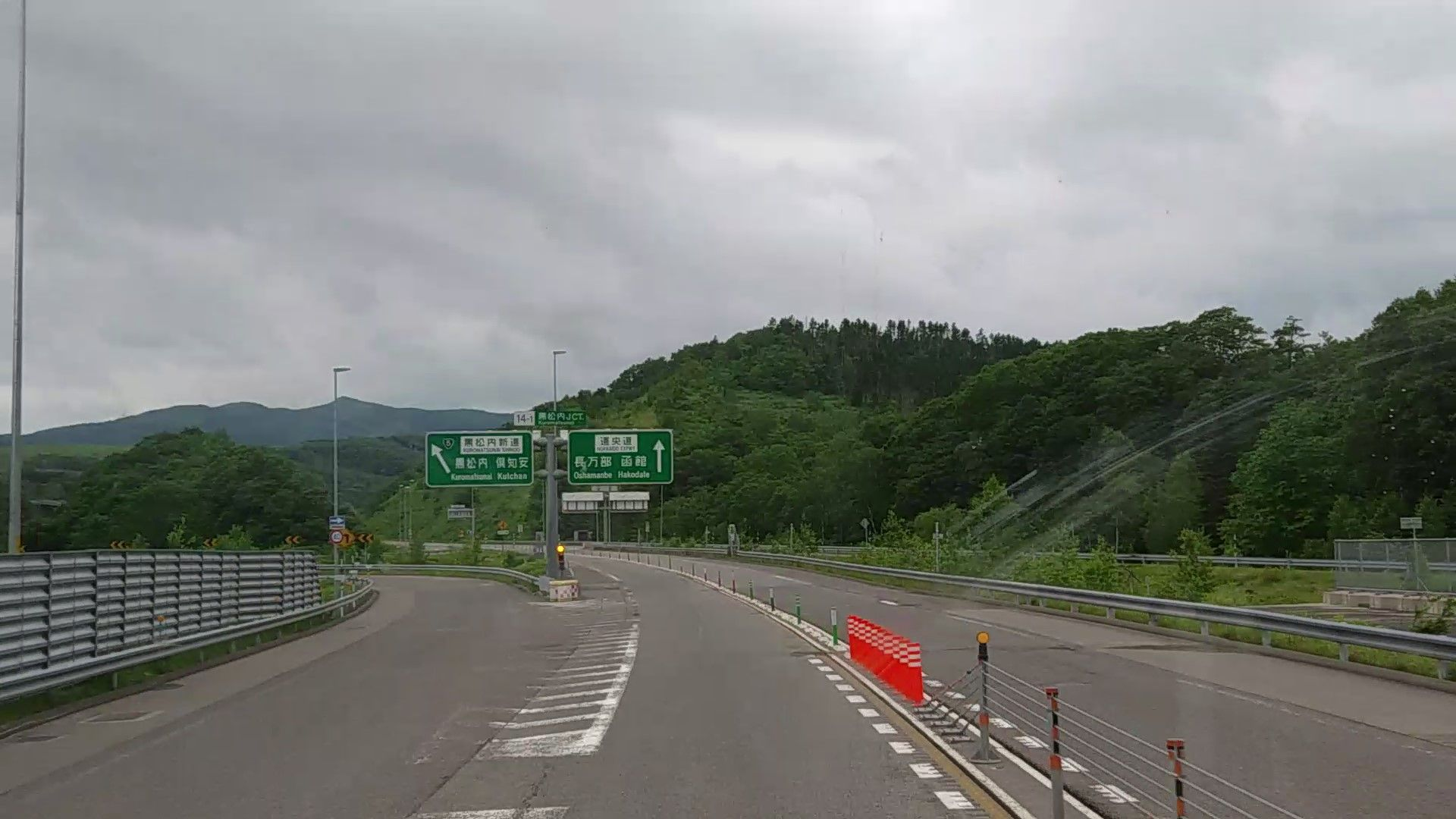
Kuromatsunai Junction on the Dō-Ō Expressway

The Kuromatsunai Shindō begins at, Kuromatsunai Junction, an interchange with the Dō-Ō Expressway in eastern Kuromatsunai. Once the expressway begins, tolls are collected by the East Nippon Expressway Company for the distance traveled along the Dō-Ō Expressway. The remainder of the Kuromatsunai Shindō is free to travel on. After passing through the toll booth a partial interchange allows access only from Hokkaido Route 344 to the westbound traffic of the Kuromatsunai Shindō and access from the expressway to Route 344. The expressway parallels the local route traveling northwest towards central Kuromatsunai. The expressway comes to an end at an at-grade junction with National Route 5.

== History ==
The Kuromatsunai Shindō opened on 7 November 2009.

== Junction list ==
The route lies entirely within Hokkaido.

Location	km	mi	Exit	Name	Destinations	Notes
Kuromatsunai	0.0	0.0	—	Kuromatsunai	Dō-Ō Expressway – Toyoura, Muroran, Oshamambe, Hakodate	Eastern terminus
Kuromatsunai	0.2	0.12	—	Kuromatsunai Toll Booth		Tolls are collected here for distance traveled on the Dō-Ō Expressway
Kuromatsunai	0.4	0.25	1	Kuromatsunai-minami	Hokkaido Route 344	Eastbound exit, westbound entrance
Kuromatsunai	5.1	3.2	2	Kuromatsunai	National Route 5 – Oshamambe, Suttsu, Otaru, Kutchan	Western terminus; at-grade junction
1.000 mi = 1.609 km; 1.000 km = 0.621 mi: Incomplete access; Tolled
