= Akaigawa Caldera =

Caldera located on the island of Hokkaido, Japan

- Location within Japan Location within Hokkaido

Highest point
- Elevation: 725 m (2,379 ft)
- Listing: Volcanoes in Japan
- Coordinates: 43°05′00″N 140°49′00″E

Naming
- Native name: 赤井川カルデラ (Japanese)

Geography
- Country: Japan
- Prefecture: Hokkaido

Geology
- Mountain type: Stratovolcano
- Rock types: Andesite, Dacite and Rhyolite
- Last eruption: Pleistocene

Akaigawa Caldera (赤井川カルデラ, Akaigawa karudera) is a caldera located in Hokkaido Prefecture, Japan. It was active anywhere between 1.7 and 1.3 million years ago.

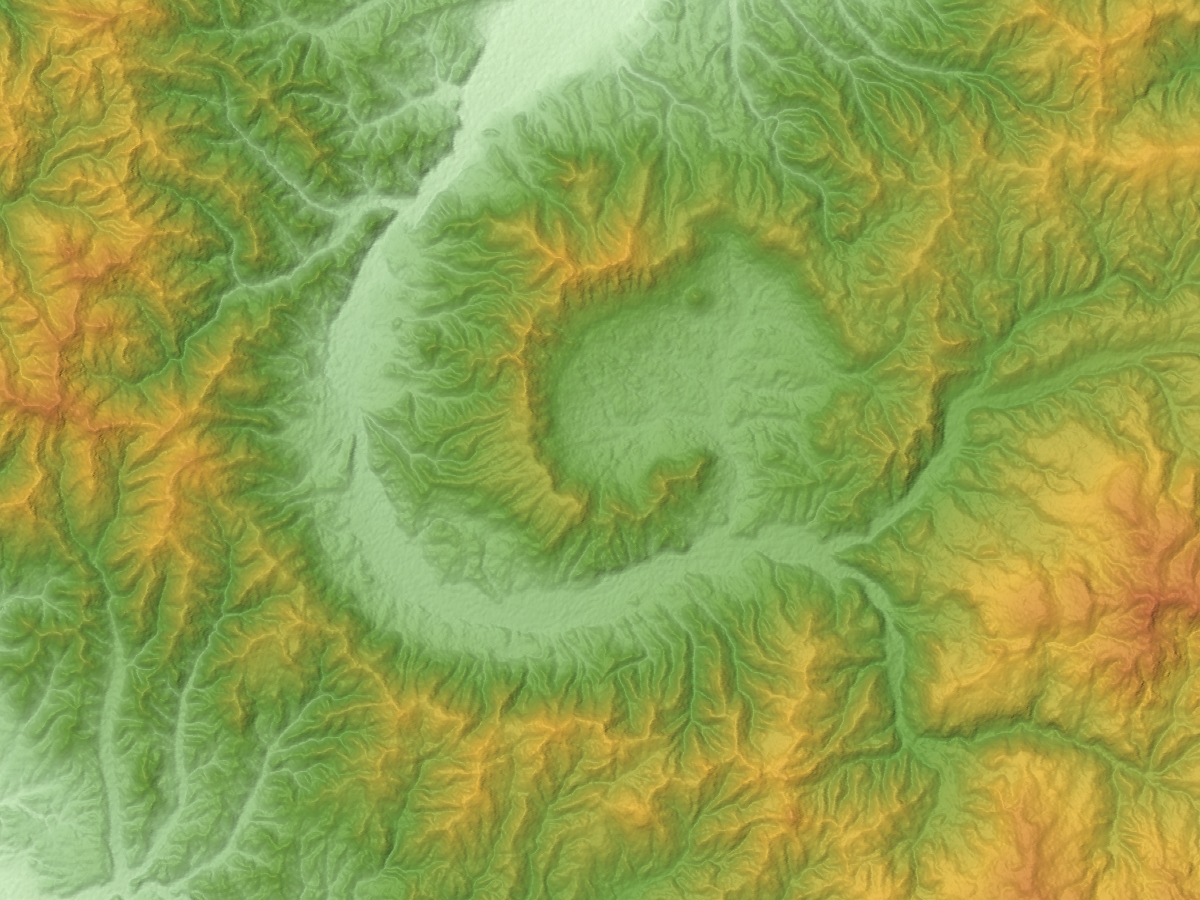
Inner: Akaigawa Caldera Outer: Yoichigawa Caldera

== See also ==
- Akaigawa, Hokkaido
