= Shin-Otaru Station =

Railway station in Otaru, Japan

Shin-Otaru Station 新小樽駅

General information
- Location: Otaru, Hokkaido; Japan
- Coordinates: 43°9′45.3″N 140°59′16.6″E
- Operator: JR Hokkaido
- Line: Hokkaido Shinkansen

History
- Opening: 2038 (scheduled)

Services
Preceding station	JR Hokkaido	Following station
Under Construction
Kutchan towards Shin-Aomori	Hokkaido Shinkansen Opens in 2038	Sapporo Terminus
Location
- Location within Hokkaido Location within Japan

Shin-Otaru Station (新小樽駅, Shin-Otaru-eki) is a railway station planned to be constructed on the Hokkaido Shinkansen in the city of Otaru, Hokkaido, Japan. Scheduled to open in 2038, it will be operated by Hokkaido Railway Company (JR Hokkaido). Once built, it will replace Shin-Hakodate-Hokuto Station as the northernmost station on the Shinkansen network.

== Lines ==
Shin-Otaru Station will be served by the Hokkaido Shinkansen between Kutchan and Sapporo Station, and will be located 4 km south of Otaru Station.

== See also ==
- List of railway stations in Japan
