= Kuromatsunai, Hokkaido =

Kuromatsunai 黒松内町
- Town
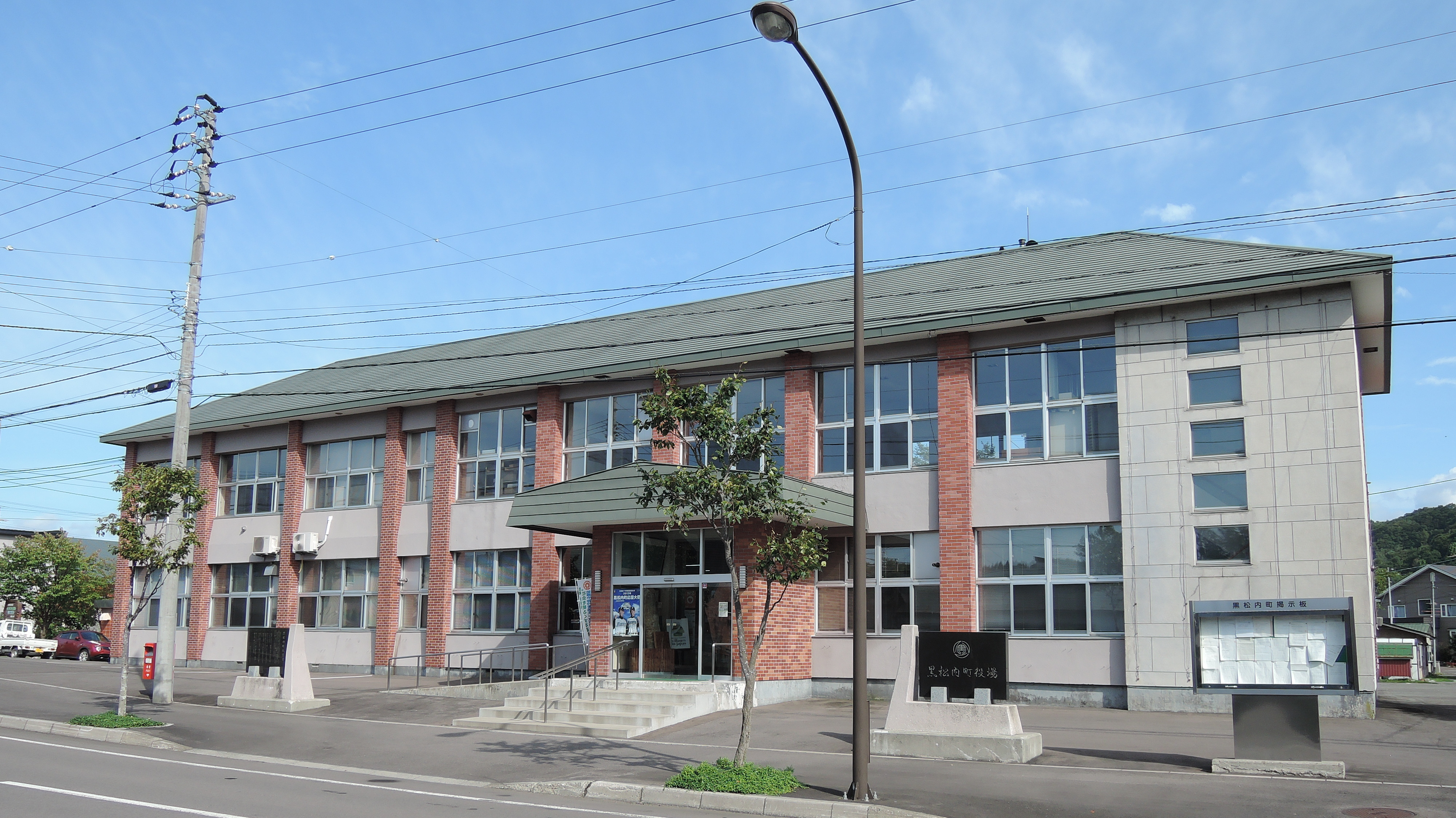
- Kuromatsunai Town Hall

- Flag Emblem

- Location of Kuromatsunai in Hokkaido (Shiribeshi Subprefecture)

- Location in Japan
- Coordinates: 42°40′4″N 140°18′27″E
- Country: Japan
- Region: Hokkaido
- Prefecture: Hokkaido (Shiribeshi Subprefecture)
- District: Suttsu

Government
  - Mayor: Mitsuru Kamada

Area
  - Total: 345.65 km^{2} (133.46 sq mi)

Population (24 May 2020)
  - Total: 2,739
  - Density: 7.924/km^{2} (20.52/sq mi)
- Time zone: UTC+09:00 (JST)
- City hall address: 302-1 Kuromatsunai, Kuromatsunai, Suttsu-gun, Hokkaido; 048-0192
- Climate: Dfb
- Website: www.kuromatsunai.com
- Symbols
- Tree: Fagus crenata

Kuromatsunai (黒松内町, Kuromatsunai-chō) is a town located in Shiribeshi, Hokkaido, Japan.

As of 24 May 2020 the town had an estimated population of 2,739, and a density of 7.2 persons per km^{2}. The total area of the town is 345.65 km^{2}.

== Geography ==
Kuromatsunai is located in the southern part of Shiribeshi Subprefecture and while close to both the Sea of Japan and the Pacific Ocean, the town itself has no coastline. The Shubuto River and Kuromatsunai River flow through Kuromatsunai.

The town, being the northernmost area of Japan in which beech trees grow naturally, has had the Fagus crenata, Japanese beech, tree designated a natural treasure. The area is known as the Kuromatsunai Depression because it is low lying compared to most of Hokkaido and is agriculturally intensive.

=== Neighboring towns and village ===
- Iburi Subprefecture
  - Toyoura
- Oshima Subprefecture
  - Oshamambe
- Shiribeshi Subprefecture
  - Rankoshi
  - Shimamaki
  - Suttsu

=== Climate ===
Climate data for Kuromatsunai (1991−2020 normals, extremes 1977−present)
Month	Jan	Feb	Mar	Apr	May	Jun	Jul	Aug	Sep	Oct	Nov	Dec	Year
Record high °C (°F)	9.1 (48.4)	9.8 (49.6)	15.5 (59.9)	24.1 (75.4)	31.9 (89.4)	31.0 (87.8)	34.5 (94.1)	34.0 (93.2)	31.1 (88.0)	26.2 (79.2)	20.9 (69.6)	13.7 (56.7)	34.5 (94.1)
Mean daily maximum °C (°F)	−0.6 (30.9)	0.1 (32.2)	3.9 (39.0)	10.3 (50.5)	16.3 (61.3)	19.8 (67.6)	23.4 (74.1)	25.0 (77.0)	22.1 (71.8)	15.8 (60.4)	8.2 (46.8)	1.5 (34.7)	12.1 (53.9)
Daily mean °C (°F)	−4.1 (24.6)	−3.7 (25.3)	−0.2 (31.6)	5.2 (41.4)	10.8 (51.4)	15.0 (59.0)	19.1 (66.4)	20.5 (68.9)	16.6 (61.9)	10.0 (50.0)	3.5 (38.3)	−2.1 (28.2)	7.6 (45.6)
Mean daily minimum °C (°F)	−8.8 (16.2)	−8.8 (16.2)	−5.2 (22.6)	−0.2 (31.6)	5.3 (41.5)	10.9 (51.6)	15.7 (60.3)	16.7 (62.1)	11.3 (52.3)	4.1 (39.4)	−1.1 (30.0)	−6.1 (21.0)	2.8 (37.1)
Record low °C (°F)	−27.8 (−18.0)	−27.0 (−16.6)	−21.1 (−6.0)	−11.2 (11.8)	−3.0 (26.6)	0.1 (32.2)	4.3 (39.7)	5.4 (41.7)	−0.2 (31.6)	−4.9 (23.2)	−14.4 (6.1)	−23.6 (−10.5)	−27.8 (−18.0)
Average precipitation mm (inches)	125.3 (4.93)	99.8 (3.93)	85.2 (3.35)	84.5 (3.33)	95.8 (3.77)	83.6 (3.29)	115.1 (4.53)	159.9 (6.30)	180.8 (7.12)	141.5 (5.57)	164.8 (6.49)	148.8 (5.86)	1,485 (58.46)
Average snowfall cm (inches)	249 (98)	212 (83)	129 (51)	14 (5.5)	0 (0)	0 (0)	0 (0)	0 (0)	0 (0)	0 (0)	49 (19)	186 (73)	838 (330)
Average precipitation days (≥ 1.0 mm)	22.6	19.0	15.2	10.9	10.2	8.7	9.7	10.9	13.0	14.8	18.5	22.7	176.2
Average snowy days (≥ 3 cm)	23.1	19.6	15.1	1.8	0	0	0	0	0	0	5.4	18.6	83.6
Mean monthly sunshine hours	33.0	45.8	102.7	167.2	180.7	136.2	112.8	131.5	148.6	130.0	70.3	36.1	1,294.7
Source: Japan Meteorological Agency

== History ==
- 1902: Kuromatsunai Village becomes a Second Class Village.
- 1915: Neppu Village becomes a Second Class Village.
- 1923: Tarukishi Village becomes a Second Class Village.
- 1955: Kuromatsunai Village, Neppu Village, and a part of Tarukishi Village are merged to form the new village of Miwa.
- 1959: Miwa Village becomes Miwa Town.
- 1959: Miwa is renamed Kuromatsunai.

== Transportation ==
- Hakodate Main Line: Kuromatsunai Station - Neppu Station
- Dō-Ō Expressway: Kuromatsunai JCT
- Kuromatsunai Shindō: Kuromatsunai JCT - Kuromatsunai-minami IC - Kuromatsunai IC
- National Route 5

== Sister city ==
- (Ehime Prefecture) Seiyo, Ehime (since 1993)

== Education ==
- Kuromatsunai Town Board of Education
  - Junior high schools
    - Kuromatsunai Junior High School
    - Shiroikawa Junior High School
  - Elementary schools
    - Kuromatsunai Elementary School
    - Shiroikawa Elementary School
