= Ranshima Station =

Railway station in Otaru, Hokkaido, Japan

S17 Ranshima Station 蘭島駅
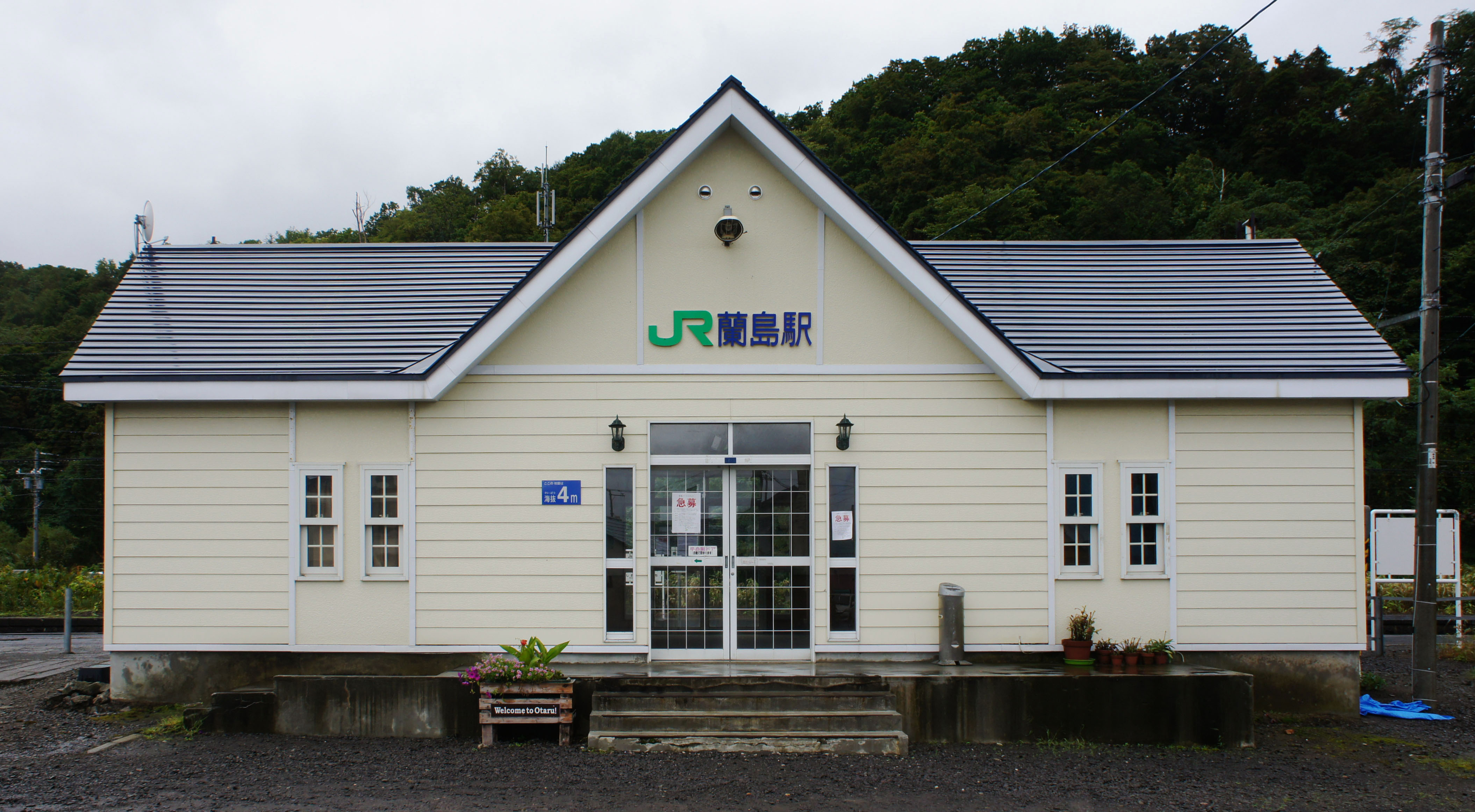
- Station building, September 2018

General information
- Location: Otaru, Hokkaido, Hokkaido; Japan
- Coordinates: 43°11′48″N 140°51′19″E
- Operator: JR Hokkaido
- Line: ■ Hakodate Main Line
- Distance: 237.9 km from Hakodate
- Platforms: 2 side platforms
- Tracks: 2

Other information
- Status: Kan'i itaku ticket window
- Station code: S17

History
- Opened: December 10, 1902

Passengers
- FY2013: 28 daily

Services
Preceding station	JR Hokkaido	Following station
Yoichi S18 towards Hakodate	Hakodate Main Line Local	Shioya S16 towards Asahikawa
Rapid
Yoichi S18 towards Kutchan	Niseko Liner	Shioya S16 towards Sapporo
Location

Ranshima Station (蘭島駅, Ranshima-eki) is a railway station on the Hakodate Main Line in Otaru, Hokkaido, Japan, operated by Hokkaido Railway Company (JR Hokkaido). The station is numbered S17.

== Lines ==
Ranshima Station is served by the Hakodate Main Line and is 237.9 km from the start of the line at Hakodate.

== Station layout ==
The station has two side platforms connected by an overpass. Kitaca is not available. A Kan'i itaku agent staffs the ticket window and sells some types of tickets.

=== Platforms ===
1	■ Hakodate Main Line	for Yoichi, Kutchan, and Oshamambe
2	■ Hakodate Main Line	for Otaru and Sapporo

== History ==
Ranshima Station opened on 12 December 1902 when the private Hokkaido Railway established a track between it and Shikaribetsu. By 28 June 1903, the track had been extended north from here to Otaru Chūō (now Otaru). By 19 Oct 1904, link ups to the track south of Shikaribetsu had allowed through traffic all the way to Hakodate. After the Hokkaido Railway was nationalized on 1 July 1907, Japanese Government Railways (JGR) took over control of the station. On 12 October 1909 the station became part of the Hakodate Main Line. On 1 April 1987, with the privatization of Japanese National Railways (JNR), the successor of JGR, the station came under the control of JR Hokkaido. From 1 October 2007, station numbering was introduced on JR Hokkaido lines, with Ranshima Station becoming "S17".
