= Suttsu, Hokkaido =

Suttsu 寿都町
- Town
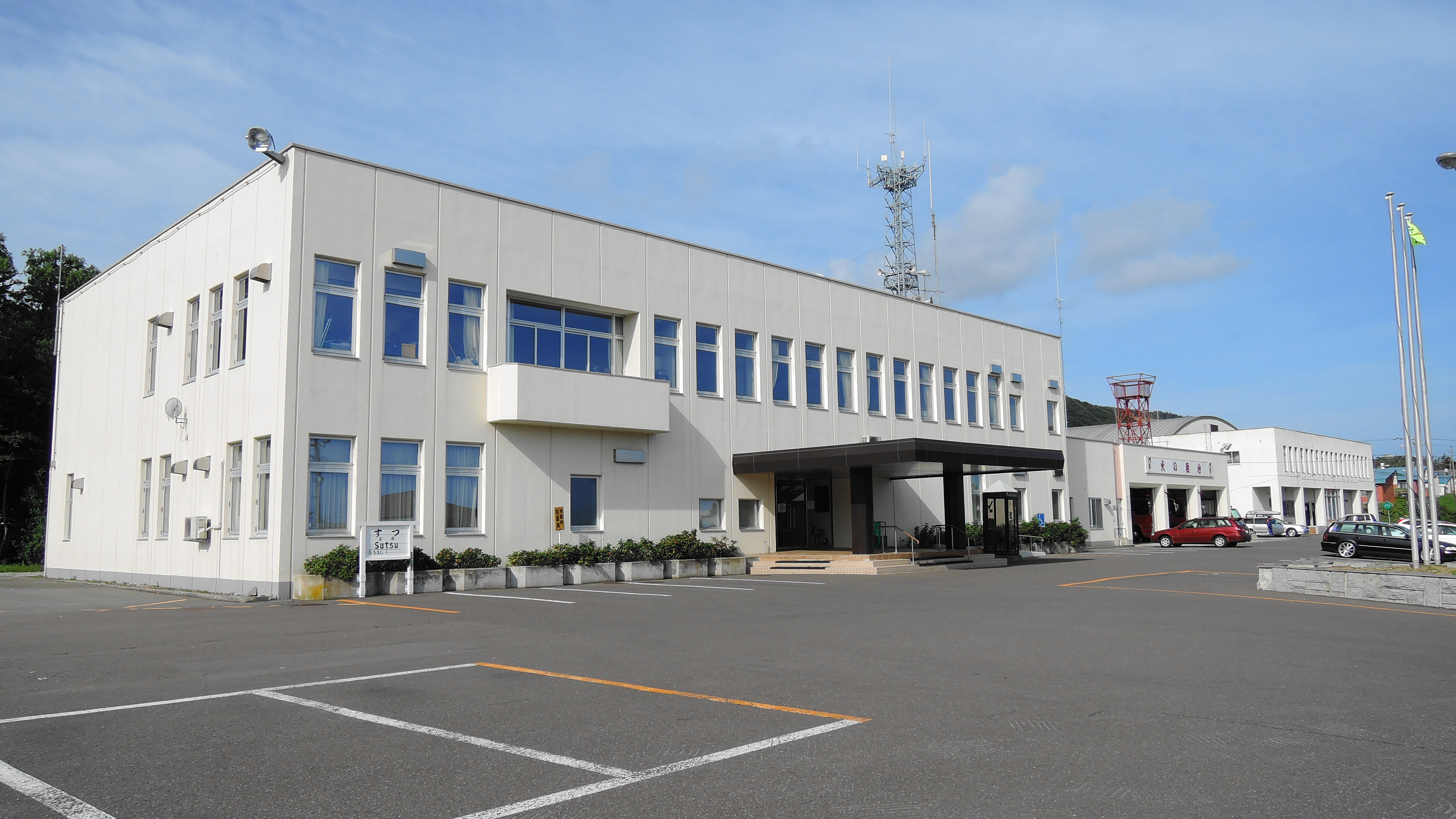
- Suttsu Town hall

- Flag Seal

- Location of Suttsu in Hokkaido (Shiribeshi Subprefecture)

- Location in Japan
- Coordinates: 42°47′N 140°14′E
- Country: Japan
- Region: Hokkaido
- Prefecture: Hokkaido (Shiribeshi Subprefecture)
- District: Suttsu

Government
  - Mayor: Haruo Kataoka

Area
  - Total: 95.36 km^{2} (36.82 sq mi)

Population (September 30, 2016)
  - Total: 3,113
  - Density: 32.64/km^{2} (84.55/sq mi)
- Time zone: UTC+09:00 (JST)
- City hall address: 140-1 Toshimacho, Suttsu, Suttsu-gun, Hokkaido; 048-0406
- Climate: Dfb
- Website: www.town.suttu.lg.jp
- Symbols
- Bird: Common gull
- Flower: Rosa rugosa
- Tree: Cherry blossom

Suttsu (寿都町, Suttsu-chō) is a town located in Shiribeshi Subprefecture, Hokkaido, Japan.

As of September 2016, the town has an estimated population of 3,113, and a density of 33 persons per km^{2}. The total area is 95.36 km^{2}.

== Geography ==
The town of Suttsu faces the Suttsu Bay, a bay of the Sea of Japan. Shubetsu River flows in the middle of the town and divides the town into east and west.

=== Neighboring towns and village ===
- Kuromatsunai
- Rankoshi
- Shimamaki

=== Climate ===
Suttsu has a humid continental climate (Köppen climate classification Dfb) with warm summers and cold winters. Precipitation is significant throughout the year, but the months from March to June are somewhat drier.

Climate data for Suttsu (elevation 33.4 m (110 ft), 1991−2020 normals, extremes 1884−present)
Month	Jan	Feb	Mar	Apr	May	Jun	Jul	Aug	Sep	Oct	Nov	Dec	Year
Record high °C (°F)	12.2 (54.0)	13.7 (56.7)	17.5 (63.5)	27.7 (81.9)	29.0 (84.2)	31.3 (88.3)	33.0 (91.4)	34.0 (93.2)	31.1 (88.0)	26.8 (80.2)	22.5 (72.5)	15.1 (59.2)	34.0 (93.2)
Mean maximum °C (°F)	5.0 (41.0)	6.4 (43.5)	11.2 (52.2)	19.3 (66.7)	24.2 (75.6)	26.1 (79.0)	28.9 (84.0)	29.9 (85.8)	26.5 (79.7)	21.2 (70.2)	16.3 (61.3)	9.0 (48.2)	30.5 (86.9)
Mean daily maximum °C (°F)	−0.2 (31.6)	0.3 (32.5)	3.9 (39.0)	10.2 (50.4)	15.7 (60.3)	19.2 (66.6)	23.0 (73.4)	24.6 (76.3)	21.6 (70.9)	15.6 (60.1)	8.4 (47.1)	2.0 (35.6)	12.0 (53.6)
Daily mean °C (°F)	−2.3 (27.9)	−1.9 (28.6)	1.2 (34.2)	6.5 (43.7)	11.5 (52.7)	15.4 (59.7)	19.5 (67.1)	21.2 (70.2)	18.1 (64.6)	12.1 (53.8)	5.6 (42.1)	−0.3 (31.5)	8.9 (48.0)
Mean daily minimum °C (°F)	−4.7 (23.5)	−4.6 (23.7)	−1.7 (28.9)	2.8 (37.0)	7.8 (46.0)	12.3 (54.1)	16.8 (62.2)	18.4 (65.1)	14.6 (58.3)	8.4 (47.1)	2.3 (36.1)	−2.8 (27.0)	5.8 (42.4)
Mean minimum °C (°F)	−10.0 (14.0)	−9.7 (14.5)	−6.7 (19.9)	−2.2 (28.0)	2.9 (37.2)	7.7 (45.9)	12.9 (55.2)	14.0 (57.2)	8.5 (47.3)	1.8 (35.2)	−4.2 (24.4)	−9.3 (15.3)	−10.7 (12.7)
Record low °C (°F)	−15.7 (3.7)	−15.0 (5.0)	−11.4 (11.5)	−7.7 (18.1)	−1.4 (29.5)	2.7 (36.9)	7.1 (44.8)	10.8 (51.4)	4.8 (40.6)	−3.6 (25.5)	−9.0 (15.8)	−15.0 (5.0)	−15.7 (3.7)
Average precipitation mm (inches)	120.2 (4.73)	87.4 (3.44)	68.1 (2.68)	59.3 (2.33)	65.9 (2.59)	60.7 (2.39)	94.5 (3.72)	130.1 (5.12)	149.8 (5.90)	128.0 (5.04)	148.2 (5.83)	138.5 (5.45)	1,250.6 (49.24)
Average snowfall cm (inches)	146 (57)	114 (45)	60 (24)	3 (1.2)	0 (0)	0 (0)	0 (0)	0 (0)	0 (0)	0 (0)	24 (9.4)	108 (43)	454 (179)
Average rainy days (≥ 1.0 mm)	22.2	18.1	13.1	9.5	8.6	8.0	8.0	9.6	11.6	13.6	18.0	22.1	162.4
Average snowy days (≥ 1 cm)	25.3	21.3	16.0	1.6	0	0	0	0	0	0	6.0	21.2	91.4
Average relative humidity (%)	69	68	66	68	74	82	85	84	78	72	69	69	74
Mean monthly sunshine hours	27.2	46.7	111.0	170.7	194.6	170.4	155.6	163.1	153.9	121.3	55.3	26.4	1,393.5
Source 1: Japan Meteorological Agency (1981 - 2010)
Source 2: Japan Meteorological Agency (1884 - )

== History ==
- 1897: Suttsu Subprefecture was established.
- 1900: Suttsu Town was founded and became a First Class Town.
- 1902: Isoya Village (Isoya District) was founded and became a Second Class Village.
- 1906: Utasutsu Village (Utasutsu District) was founded and became a Second Class Village.
- 1910: Suttsu Subprefecture was abolished and Shiribeshi Subprefecture was established in Kutchan.
- 1923: Masadomari Village and Tarukishi Village became Second Class Villages.
- 1933: Suttsu Town and Masadomari Village were merged to form the new town of Suttsu.
- 1955: Suttsu Town, Isoya Village, Utasutsu Village, and a part of Tarukishi Village were merged to form the new town of Suttsu.

== Industry ==
Fisheries comprise the main economic activity of Suttsu. The town developed by the fishery of herring. Because of a decrease of fishery resources, Suttsu focuses on an aquaculture business now.

== Education ==
- Suttsu Town Board of Education
  - High school
    - Hokkaido Suttsu High School
  - Junior high school
    - Suttsu Junior High School
  - Elementary school
    - Oshoro Elementary School
    - Suttsu Elementary School
