= Suttsu District, Hokkaido =

District in Hokkaido, Japan

Coordinates: 42.702°N 140.327°E

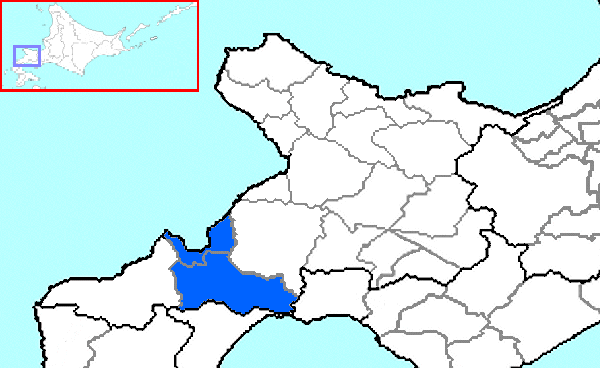
Suttsu District in Shiribeshi Subprefecture.

Suttsu (寿都郡, Suttsu-gun) is a district located in Shiribeshi Subprefecture, Hokkaido, Japan.

As of 2004, the district has an estimated population of 7,316 and a density of 16.60 persons per km^{2}. The total area is 440.83 km^{2}.

== Towns ==
- Kuromatsunai
- Suttsu
