= Yoichi District, Hokkaido =

District in Hokkaido, Japan

Coordinates: 43.117°N 140.798°E

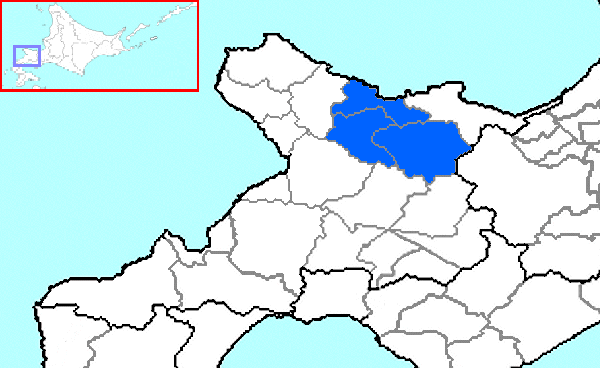
Yoichi District in Shiribeshi Subprefecture.

Yoichi (余市郡, Yoichi-gun) is a district located in Shiribeshi Subprefecture, Hokkaido, Japan.

As of 2004, the district has an estimated population of 28,213 and a density of 47.93 persons per km^{2}. The total area is 588.64 km^{2}.

== History ==
Yoichi developed as an agricultural area in the 1870s. Some of the first Japanese apple tree orchards were created here, with assistance from American farmers (there are no native apple species in Japan).

== Towns and villages ==
- Akaigawa
- Niki
- Yoichi
