= Neppu Station =

Railway station in Kuromatsunai, Hokkaido, Japan

Neppu Station 熱郛駅
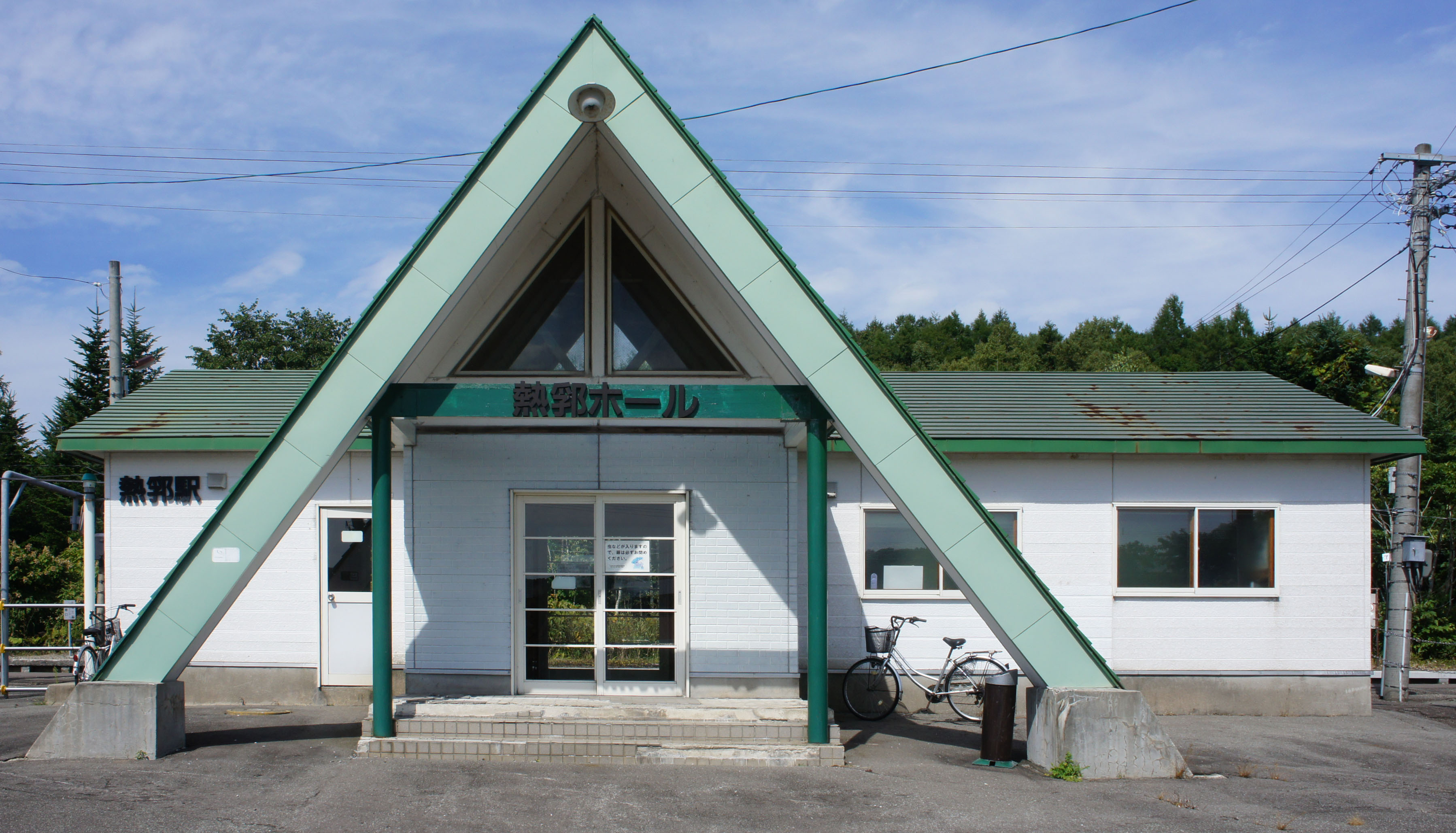
- The station in 2017.

General information
- Location: Shiroikawa, Kuromatsunai, Suttsu, Hokkaido （北海道寿都郡黒松内町字白井川） Japan
- Coordinates: 42°40′32″N 140°22′30″E
- Operator: JR Hokkaido
- Line: Hakodate Main Line
- Connections

Other information
- Station code: S29

History
- Opened: 1903
- Former names: Utasutsu (until 1905)

Passengers
- 1992: 44 daily
Location

Neppu Station (熱郛駅, Neppu-eki) is a railway station in Kuromatsunai, Suttsu District, Hokkaidō, Japan.

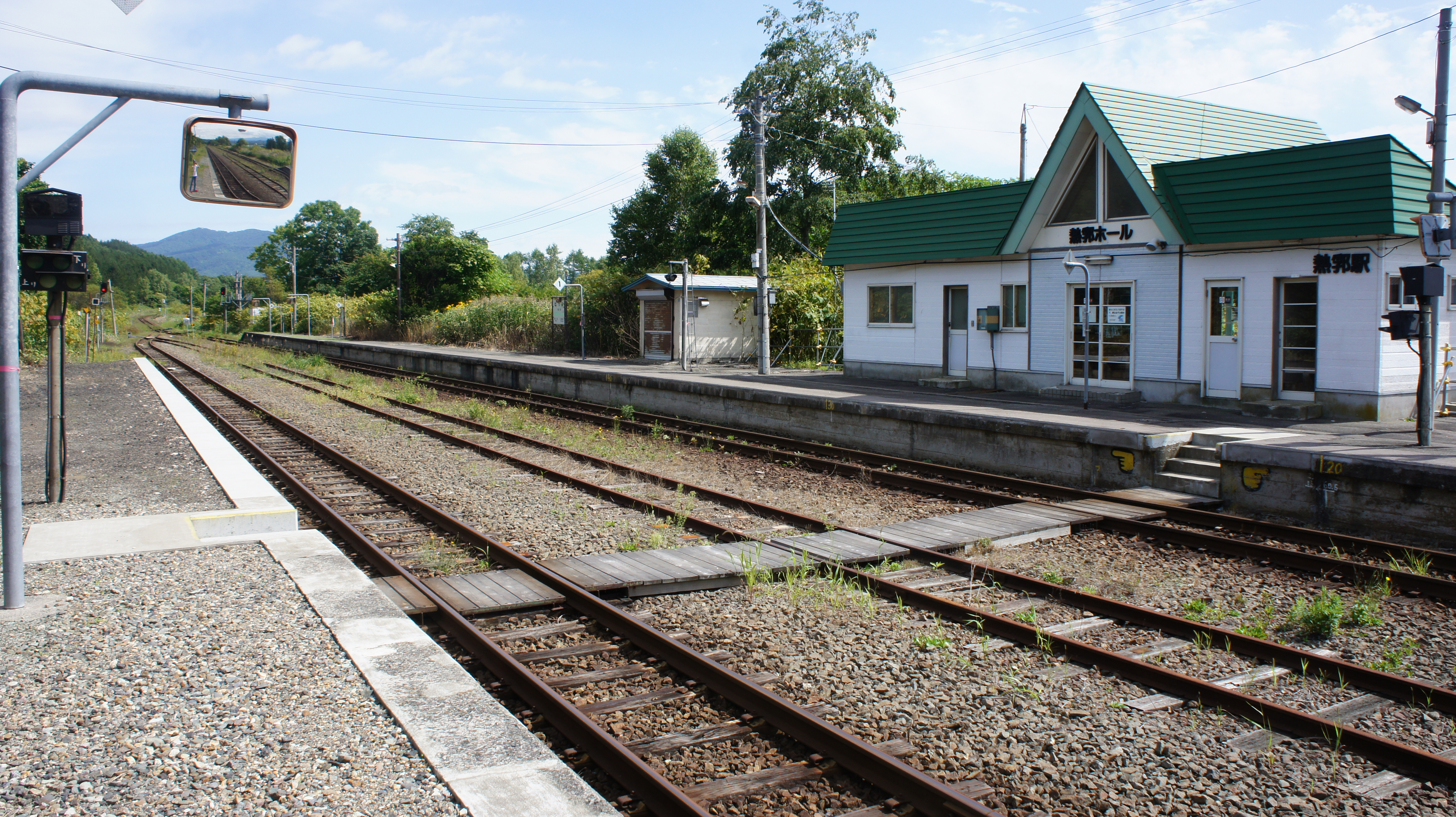
JR Hakodate-Main-Line Neppu Station railroad crossing

== Lines ==
- Hokkaido Railway Company
  - Hakodate Main Line Station S29

== Adjacent stations ==
«	Service	»
Hakodate Main Line
Kuromatsunai	Local	Mena

== Passenger statistics ==
In fiscal 1992, the station was used by an average of 44 passengers daily.

== Surrounding area ==
- National Route 5
- Roadside station Kuromatsunai
- Kuromatsunai Shindo Kuromatsunai I.C.
- Mount Kuromatsunai
