= Kutchan Station =

Railway station in Kutchan, Hokkaido, Japan

S23 Kutchan Station 倶知安駅
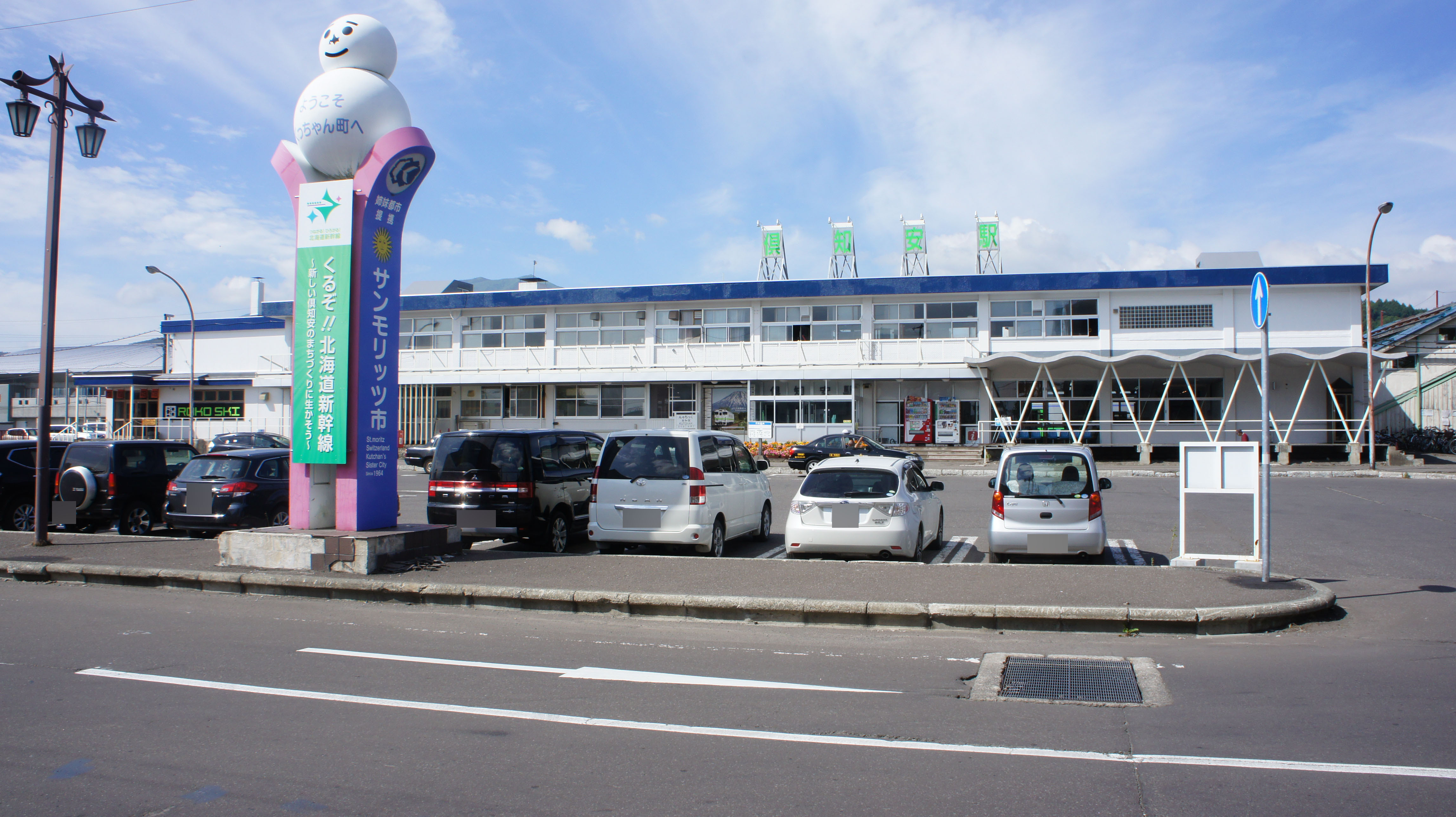
- Kutchan Station in 2017

General information
- Location: Kita 3 Jōnishi, Kutchan-chō, Abuta-gun, Hokkaidō 044-0033; Japan
- Coordinates: 42°54′06″N 140°44′44″E
- Operator: JR Hokkaido
- Lines: Hakodate Main Line; Hokkaido Shinkansen (Opens in 2038)
- Distance: 193.3 km (120.1 mi) from Hakodate
- Platforms: 1 island platform
- Tracks: 2

Construction
- Structure type: At grade

Other information
- Station code: S23
- Website: Staffed - JR Hokkaido ticket window (Midori no Madoguchi)

History
- Opened: 15 October 1904; 122 years ago

Services
Preceding station	JR Hokkaido	Following station
Under Construction
Oshamambe towards Shin-Aomori	Hokkaido Shinkansen Opens in 2038	Shin-Otaru towards Sapporo
Local
Hirafu S24 towards Hakodate	Hakodate Main Line	Kozawa S22 towards Asahikawa
Rapid
Hirafu S24 One-way operation	Niseko Liner	Kozawa S22 towards Sapporo
Location
- Location within Hokkaido Location within Japan

Kutchan Station (倶知安駅, Kutchan-eki) is a railway station on the Hakodate Main Line in Kutchan, Hokkaido, Japan. It is operated by JR Hokkaido and has the station number "S23". The station is also planned to become a station of the Hokkaido Shinkansen between Oshamambe and Shin-Otaru that is scheduled to open in 2038.

== Lines ==
The station is served by the Hakodate Main Line and is located 193.3 km from the start of the line at Hakodate. Both local and the Rapid Niseko Liner services stop at the station. When the Hokkaido Shinkansen opens in the spring of 2031, the Hakodate Main Line will be truncated and the section of track between Oshamambe and Otaru will be abolished. This will leave Kutchan Station with no conventional line and only the Shinkansen will serve it.

== Station layout ==
=== Platforms ===
2	■Hakodate Main Line	for Oshamambe and Hakodate
3	■Hakodate Main Line	for Otaru and Sapporo

== History ==
The station was opened on 15 October 1904 by the private Hokkaido Railway as an intermediate station during a phase of expansion when its track from Hakodate to Neppu was extended to link up with stretches of track further north to provide through traffic from Hakodate to Otaru. After the Hokkaido Railway was nationalized on 1 July 1907, Japanese Government Railways (JGR) took over control of the station. On 12 October 1909 the station became part of the Hakodate Main Line. With the privatization of Japanese National Railways (JNR), the successor of JGR, control of the station passed to JR Hokkaido.

The Iburi Line served Kutchan from Datemombetsu Station on the Muroran Line, but the line was abolished in 1986. A curve, where the track has now been lifted from, can still clearly be seen north of Kutchan Station from satellite imagery.

== Surrounding area ==
- Kutchan town office

== See also ==
- List of railway stations in Japan
