= Seibi Shinkansen =

Planned high-speed rail routes in Japan

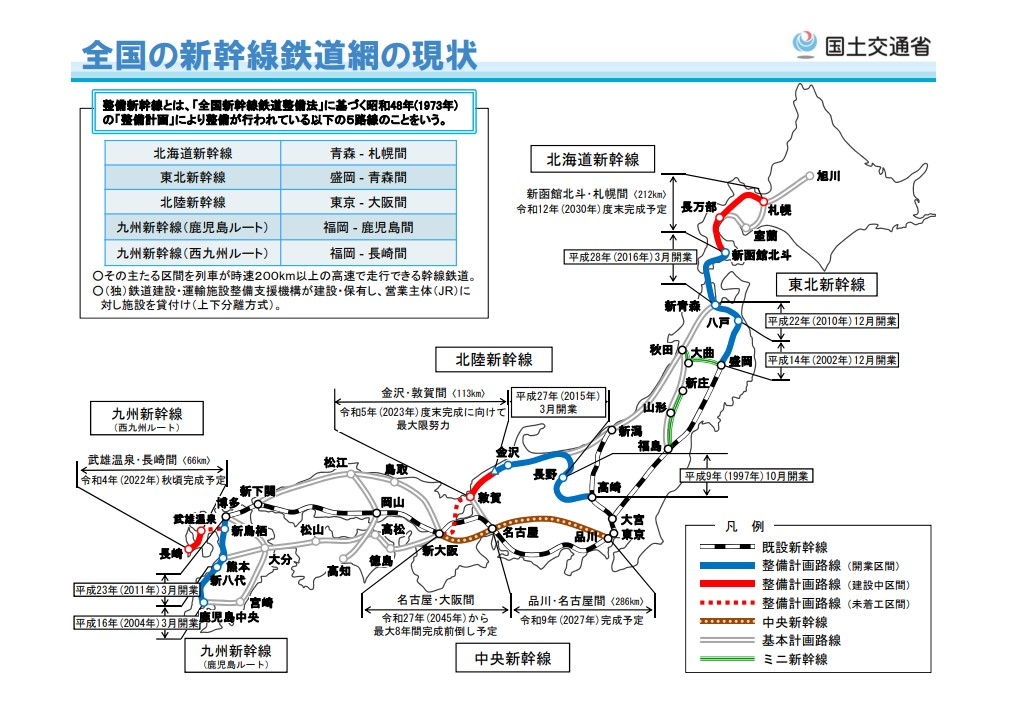
The status of Seibi Shinkansen lines as of 2021, shown in blue and red lines. (Note: The blue line sections have already opened, the solid red line sections were under construction (however, as of 2026, the Kanazawa — Tsuruga section of the Hokuriku Shinkansen and the Takeo-Onsen — Nagasaki section of the Nishi Kyūshū Shinkansen have since opened), and the dashed red sections had not yet begun construction.)

The Seibi Shinkansen (整備新幹線; "Development Shinkansen") refers to five planned routes of Shinkansen, a High-speed rail of Japan, for which the Japanese government announced the basic plan in 1972 pursuant to Article 7 of the Nationwide Shinkansen Railway Development Act (全国新幹線鉄道整備法, Zenkoku Shinkansen Tetsudō Seibihō) (Act No. 71 of 1970), and subsequently approved the development plan on November 13, 1973. At the time, these lines were often referred to as the Seibi Go-sen (整備5線; "Five Development Lines") or Seibi Go Shinkansen (整備5新幹線; "Five Development Shinkansen Lines"), but today the term "Seibi Shinkansen" has become the standard designation.

List of Seibi Shinkansen Lines
Line name	Japanese	Start	Terminal	Major cities along route	Length	Status	Sections in operation	Sections under construction (Planned opening)	Sections not yet started
Hokkaidō Shinkansen	北海道新幹線	Aomori, Aomori	Sapporo, Hokkaido	Near Hakodate and Otaru	360 km	Partially open	Shin-Aomori — Shin-Hakodate-Hokuto	Shin-Hakodate-Hokuto — Sapporo (Scheduled for completion by FY2038)	
Tōhoku Shinkansen	東北新幹線	Morioka, Iwate	Aomori, Aomori	Near Hachinohe	179 km	Fully open	Morioka — Shin-Aomori		
Hokuriku Shinkansen	北陸新幹線	Tokyo	Osaka, Osaka	Near Nagano, Toyama, and Obama	600 km	Partially open	Tokyo — Tsuruga (Note: The section between Tokyo — Ōmiya is shared with the Tōhoku Shinkansen and the Jōetsu Shinkansen. The section between Ōmiya — Takasaki is shared with the Jōetsu Shinkansen.)		Tsuruga — Shin-Osaka
Kyūshū Shinkansen (Kagoshima Route)	九州新幹線（鹿児島ルート）	Fukuoka, Fukuoka	Kagoshima, Kagoshima	Near Kumamoto and Satsumasendai	257 km	Fully open	Hakata — Kagoshima-Chūō		
Kyūshū Shinkansen (West Kyūshū Route) (Note: The line name used in the development plan. Upon its opening, the name used for passenger information became the Nishi Kyūshū Shinkansen.)	九州新幹線（西九州ルート）	Fukuoka, Fukuoka	Nagasaki, Nagasaki	Near Saga	118 km	Partially open	Hakata — Shin-Tosu (Note: Shared with the Kyūshū Shinkansen (Kagoshima Route).); Takeo-Onsen — Nagasaki		Shin-Tosu — Takeo-Onsen

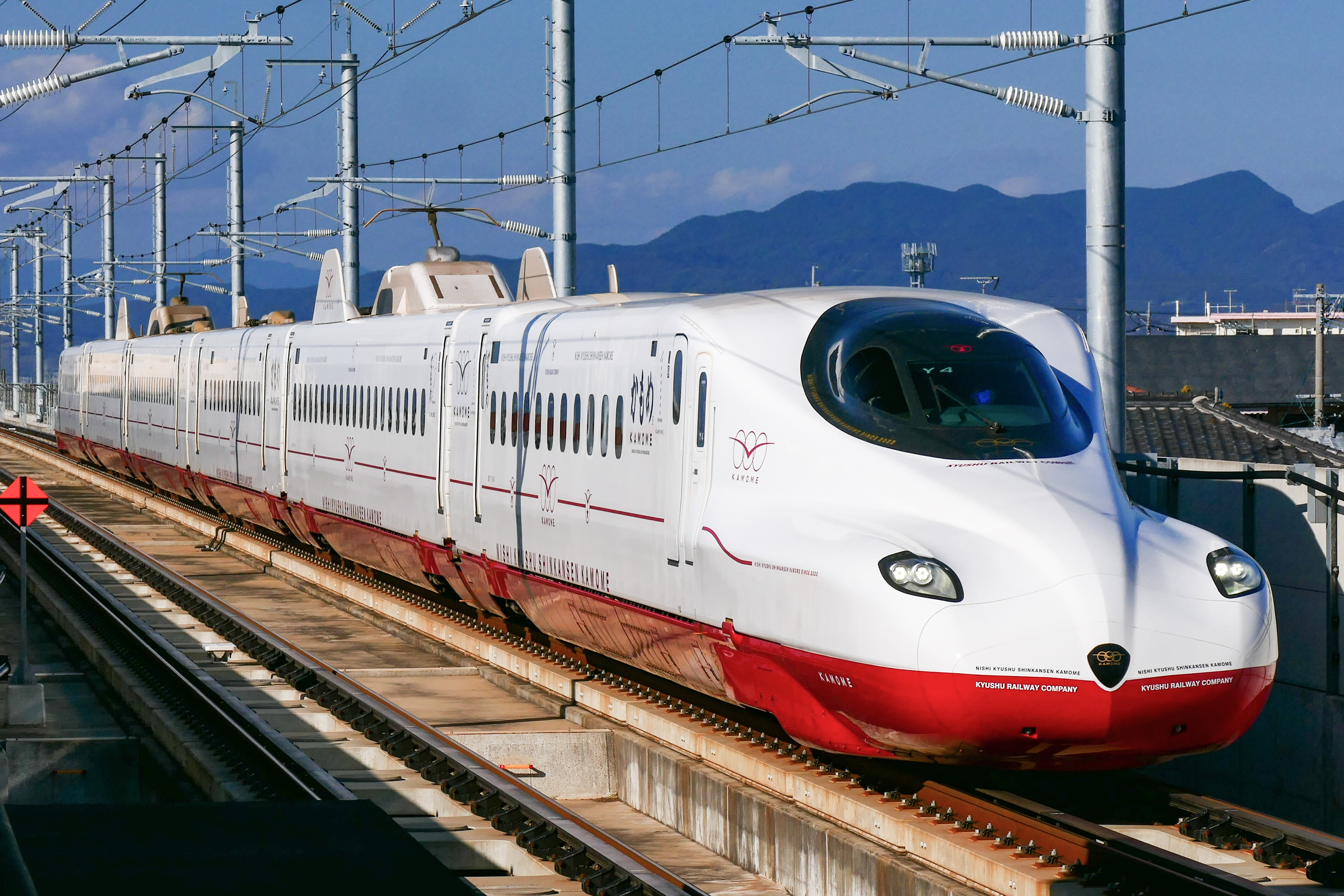
Nishi Kyūshū Shinkansen (planned as the Kyūshū Shinkansen West Kyūshū Route), one of the five Seibi Shinkansen lines.

The following earlier Shinkansen lines — Tōkaidō Shinkansen, Sanyō Shinkansen, Tōhoku Shinkansen (Tokyo — Morioka section), Jōetsu Shinkansen, and the Narita Shinkansen (whose plan was later canceled) — are not included among the Seibi Shinkansen.

Similarly, the twelve Kihon Keikaku Rosen (基本計画路線; "Basic Plan Lines"), whose basic plans were announced on November 15, 1973—one year later than the Seibi Shinkansen—are not included in the Seibi Shinkansen category. Of these twelve lines, only the maglev Chūō Shinkansen, for which the development plan was approved in May 2011, has actually commenced construction to date.

== History ==
=== Establishment of the basic plan ===
In 1970, the Nationwide Shinkansen Railway Development Act (全国新幹線鉄道整備法) was enacted. Under this law, the construction of Shinkansen lines was promoted with the aims of fostering economic development and regional revitalization of Japan.

Based on the Act, the following routes were officially designated as part of the national basic plan:

- Tōhoku Shinkansen (Morioka — Aomori): Notification No. 242 (1972)
- Hokkaidō Shinkansen (Aomori — Sapporo), Hokuriku Shinkansen (Tokyo — Osaka), and Kyūshū Shinkansen (Fukuoka — Kagoshima): Notification No. 243 (1972)
- Kyūshū Shinkansen (Fukuoka — Nagasaki): Notification No. 466 (1972)

=== Decision on the construction plan ===
On November 13, 1973, the Minister of Transport approved the construction plans for five Shinkansen lines.

Line	Propulsion system	Maximum design speed	Estimated construction cost (including rolling stock)	Construction body	Notes
Tōhoku Shinkansen	EMU using adhesion drive	260 km/h	¥330 billion	JNR	
Hokkaidō Shinkansen	EMU using adhesion drive	260 km/h	¥630 billion	JRCPC	1. The Hokkaidō Shinkansen shares the Seikan Tunnel section with the Tsugaru Kaikyō Line.; 2. The estimated cost does not include the expenses for the Tsugaru Kaikyō Line works.
Hokuriku Shinkansen	EMU using adhesion drive	260 km/h	¥1.17 trillion	JRCPC	The section between Tokyo and Takasaki is shared with the Jōetsu Shinkansen.
Kyūshū Shinkansen (Fukuoka — Kagoshima)	EMU using adhesion drive	260 km/h	¥445 billion	JNR	
Kyūshū Shinkansen (Fukuoka — Nagasaki)	EMU using adhesion drive	260 km/h	¥215 billion	JNR	1. The line diverges from the Kyūshū Shinkansen (Fukuoka — Kagoshima) in the Chikushi Plain, sharing the section from Fukuoka to the divergence point.; 2. The estimated cost excludes the shared section with the Fukuoka — Kagoshima route.

=== The MOT Proposal and the launch of five sections ===
In 1988, the Ministry of Transport (MOT, the current MLIT) announced what became known as the "MOT Proposal (運輸省案)". This plan aimed to reduce construction costs while achieving higher operating speeds by combining different construction methods, such as the Mini-Shinkansen (Note: The "Mini-Shinkansen" concept refers to a method in which, instead of constructing entirely new Shinkansen tracks, existing conventional railway lines are converted to standard gauge and modified so that trains can run through directly onto Shinkansen lines. Examples that were later actually implemented include the Akita Shinkansen and the Yamagata Shinkansen.) system and the Super Tokkyū concept. (Note: The Super Tokkyū ("Super Limited Express") concept refers to a new line constructed so that it could eventually accommodate Shinkansen operations. Infrastructure such as the roadbed, tunnels, and viaducts would be built to Shinkansen standards, but the track gauge would remain Japan's conventional narrow-gauge standard of 1,067 mm. No actual examples of this system were ever adopted.) Under this policy, construction began on sections of three lines — the Tōhoku, Hokuriku, and Kyūshū (Kagoshima Route) Shinkansen — marking the first major progress in the Seibi Shinkansen project since its designation in the 1970s.

The proposed plan was met with strong criticism from local governments and politicians along the designated construction sections. The Governor of Toyama Prefecture at the time criticized this, stating that it was like "I ordered eel (a full-standard Shinkansen) but the restaurant served me conger (Mini Shinkansen) or loach (Super Tokkyū) instead", reflecting widespread dissatisfaction. Nevertheless, since it was unclear when the next opportunity for new Shinkansen construction would arise if this one were missed, local authorities reluctantly accepted the plan. Later that same year, the government and ruling parties agreed on the construction priority order as follows:

1. Hokuriku Shinkansen: Takasaki — Nagano (Takasaki — Karuizawa: Full-standard, Karuizawa — Nagano: Mini-Shinkansen. However, if Nagano were selected to host the Winter Olympics, conversion to full-standard would be considered.)

→ Eventually opened in 1997 as a full-standard Shinkansen line.

1. Hokuriku Shinkansen: Takaoka — Kanazawa: Super Tokkyū.

→ Construction started in August 1992 between Isurugi — Kanazawa.
→ Opened in 2015 as a full-standard Shinkansen line.

2. Tōhoku Shinkansen: Morioka — Aomori (Numakunai (Note: Renamed to Iwate-Numakunai Station upon the opening of the Shinkansen extension.) — Hachinohe: Full-standard, Sections before and after: Mini-Shinkansen)

→ Opened as full-standard between Morioka — Hachinohe in 2002, and Hachinohe — Shin-Aomori in 2010.

3. Kyūshū Shinkansen (Kagoshima Route): Yatsushiro — Nishi-Kagoshima (Note: Renamed to Kagoshima-Chūō Station upon the opening of the Shinkansen.) : Super Tokkyū

→ Later revised to start from Shin-Yatsushiro, and opened in 2004 as a full-standard Shinkansen line.

4. Hokuriku Shinkansen: Itoigawa — Uozu: Super Tokkyū

→ Construction began in October 1993, but no work was carried out between the proposed Shin-Kurobe (Note: A provisional name used during the planning stage. Opened as Kurobe-Unazukionsen Station upon the opening of the Shinkansen extension.) — Uozu, as that section was intended merely as a connecting link to the conventional line.

However, due to limited national funding for Shinkansen construction, only the highest-priority section, the full-standard Takasaki — Karuizawa segment, began construction the following year in 1989. The remaining sections did not commence until after 1991, when the proceeds from the transfer of existing Shinkansen lines (see the section on the "Old funding scheme") became a designated financial source for new Shinkansen construction.

In 1991, following the decision at the International Olympic Committee General Assembly held in Birmingham, United Kingdom, to award the 1998 Winter Olympics to Nagano, the section between Karuizawa — Nagano was upgraded from the planned Mini-Shinkansen to a full-standard Shinkansen.

Meanwhile, for the Takaoka — Kanazawa section, which had the same construction priority ranking, opposition arose from local municipalities in Toyama Prefecture along the Hokuriku Main Line (Isurugi — Takaoka section), which was to be separated from JR as a heikō zairaisen (parallel conventional line). As a result, the planned route was modified to run between Shin-Takaoka — Kanazawa, and the construction section was shortened to Isurugi — Kanazawa.

In 1994, during the scheduled five-year review of Shinkansen construction plans, momentum grew for authorizing new projects. However, funding constraints again became a major obstacle. Consequently, the Tōhoku Shinkansen Morioka — Numakunai section, which had originally been planned as a Mini-Shinkansen, was upgraded to full-standard, while the start of construction on the Hachinohe — Aomori section was postponed.

=== Launch of three new sections under the new funding scheme ===
In 1996, a new funding policy was introduced. This framework utilized property tax reduction measures (50% reduction) granted to the three JR companies on Honshū (JR East, JR Central, and JR West) as a financial resource for new Shinkansen construction. This led to renewed momentum for selecting new construction sections.

On December 25, 1996, the government–ruling party committee agreed to select three candidate sections across three Shinkansen lines. After profitability studies and evaluations by the Government–Ruling Party Committee for Seibi Shinkansen Development (政府・与党整備新幹線検討委員会), the construction authorization and priority order were finalized on January 21, 1998. Construction on these sections officially began in March 1998.

1. Tōhoku Shinkansen: Hachinohe — Shin-Aomori: Full-standard

→ Opened in 2010.

1. Kyūshū Shinkansen (Kagoshima Route): Funagoya (Note: Renamed to Chikugo-Funagoya Station upon the opening of the Shinkansen extension.) — Shin-Yatsushiro: Super Tokkyū

→ The starting point of the concurrently constructed Yatsushiro — Nishi-Kagoshima section was changed to Shin-Yatsushiro.
→ Opened as full-standard Shinkansen in 2011.

2. Hokuriku Shinkansen: Nagano — Jōetsu (Note: A provisional name used during the planning stage. Opened as Jōetsumyōkō Station upon the opening of the Shinkansen extension. (It is the same station as the conventional line's Wakinoda Station, which was renamed.)) : Full-standard

→ Opened in 2015.

=== Formation of the LDP–Liberal–Komeito Coalition and the launch of three new sections ===
In 1999, with the formation of the Liberal Democratic Party (LDP)–Liberal Party and later the LDP–Liberal–Komeito coalition governments, a new review of Shinkansen development policy was undertaken. The resulting proposal called for both upgrading partially constructed sections to full-standard specifications and starting construction on new sections. In 2000, MOT requested in its FY2001 budget proposal the initiation of new construction for the Hokuriku Shinkansen section between Jōetsu — Itoigawa, and the Kyūshū Shinkansen section between Hakata — Funagoya.

Subsequently, a government–ruling party agreement finalized the decision to begin new construction on two lines (three sections), adding the Shin-Kurobe — Toyama section to the Hokuriku Shinkansen plan.

- Hokuriku Shinkansen: Jōetsu — Itoigawa, and Shin-Kurobe — Toyama: Full standard. At the same time, the section already under construction between Itoigawa — Shin-Kurobe was also upgraded to full standard specifications.

→ Opened in 2015.

- Kyūshū Shinkansen (Kagoshima Route): Hakata — Funagoya : Full standard. Simultaneously, the section already under construction between Funagoya — Nishi-Kagoshima was also upgraded to full standard specifications.

→ Opened in 2011.

=== Partial opening of the Kyūshū Shinkansen and the launch of three new sections ===
On March 13, 2004, the section of the Kyūshū Shinkansen between Shin-Yatsushiro — Kagoshima-Chūō opened for service. Around the same time, review work was conducted in preparation for new construction starts. On June 10, 2004, the ruling parties' Shinkansen Construction Promotion Project Team reached an agreement that finalized three new sections (or four if including the section around Fukui Station) to be newly constructed.

- Hokkaidō Shinkansen: Shin-Aomori — Shin-Hakodate (Note: A provisional name used during the planning stage. Opened as Shin-Hakodate-Hokuto Station upon the opening of the Shinkansen. (It is the same station as the conventional line's Oshima-Ōno Station, which was renamed.)) : Full standard

→ Opened in 2016.

- Hokuriku Shinkansen: Toyama — Isurugi, and Kanazawa — Hakusan General Rolling Stock Yard: Full standard. At the same time, the section already under construction between Isurugi — Kanazawa was upgraded to full standard specifications.

→ Opened in 2015.

- Hokuriku Shinkansen: Fukui Station: Construction began on June 4, 2005, and was completed on February 19, 2009. From 2015 to 2018, the facility was temporarily used by Echizen Railway.
- Kyūshū Shinkansen Nagasaki Route (West Kyūshū Route) : Takeo-Onsen — Isahaya: Super Tokkyū

→ Opened in 2022 as a full standard Shinkansen line.

In 2005, new construction began on the Hokkaidō Shinkansen and Hokuriku Shinkansen sections. As for the Nagasaki (West Kyūshū) Route, construction was delayed because local municipalities along the section of the heikō zairaisen (parallel conventional line) — the Nagasaki Main Line between Hizen-Yamaguchi (Note: Renamed to Kōhoku Station upon the opening of the Shinkansen.) — Isahaya — specifically Kōhoku Town and Kashima City in Saga Prefecture, opposed the management separation of the line. Although the national government allocated about 1 billion yen annually for the project from 2005 onward as part of public works expenditures, construction could not begin, and the budget remained unused. Subsequently, in December 2007, a so-called "three-party agreement" was reached among Saga Prefecture, Nagasaki Prefecture, and JR Kyūshū, adopting a "vertical separation model", (Note: This is a method in which ownership of railway infrastructure and operation of railway services are separated. Under this arrangement, local governments bear the cost of owning the railway facilities, while JR Kyūshū is responsible only for operating the trains.) under which JR Kyūshū would continue operating the heikō zairaisen section for 20 years after the Shinkansen opened. Following this agreement, official construction approval was granted in March 2008, and work commenced the following month in April.

=== First new construction under the DPJ administration ===
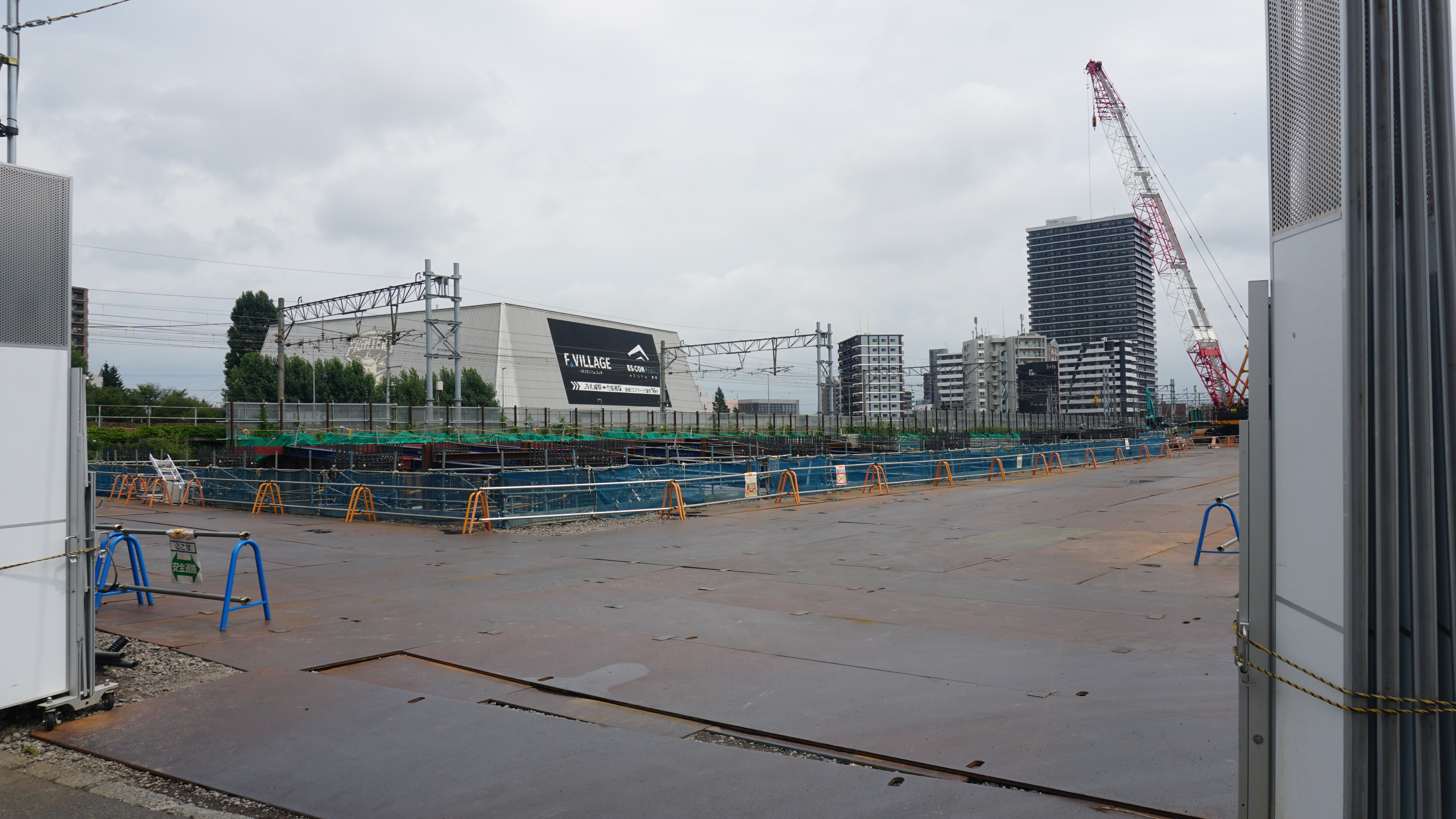
Construction site of the rolling stock depot for the Hokkaidō Shinkansen in Sapporo (July 2025).

Following the change of government in September 2009 from the Liberal Democratic Party (LDP) to the Democratic Party of Japan (DPJ), a major review of public works projects was carried out. As a result, construction of the unstarted sections of the Hokkaido, Hokuriku, and Kyūshū (West Kyūshū Route) Shinkansen lines was temporarily frozen. These sections faced significant challenges, including enormous construction costs and difficulties in reaching agreements with local municipalities along the routes regarding the separation of heikō zairaisen.

However, progress was made toward securing financial resources by allocating the track usage fees paid by JR companies to construction funding, and negotiations with local governments along the planned routes advanced. In addition, after the Great East Japan Earthquake in 2011, national policy shifted toward focusing on strengthening core infrastructure. Consequently, at the end of 2011, the Ministry of Land, Infrastructure, Transport and Tourism (MLIT) announced its intention to begin construction on the following three sections, on the condition that agreements be reached with local governments along the routes:

- Hokkaidō Shinkansen: Shin-Hakodate — Sapporo: 212 km
- Hokuriku Shinkansen: Kanazawa — Tsuruga: 124 km (excluding the already completed section around Fukui Station)

→ Opened in 2024

- Kyūshū Shinkansen Nagasaki Route (West Kyūshū Route) : Isahaya — Nagasaki: 21 km. The entire section between Takeo-Onsen — Nagasaki was changed to full standard specification.

→ Opened in 2022

Official approval for construction was granted on June 29, 2012. The target completion years were set as fiscal 2035 for the Hokkaidō Shinkansen, 2025 for the Hokuriku Shinkansen, and 2022 for the Kyūshū Shinkansen West Kyūshū Route , including the already started section between Takeo-Onsen — Isahaya. Subsequently, under the restored LDP administration, an accelerated schedule for construction was officially decided on January 14, 2015.

=== Unstarted sections ===
As of April 2026, the following sections of the Seibi Shinkansen network remain unstarted:

- Hokuriku Shinkansen: Tsuruga — Shin-Osaka: Approximately 143 km (planned route passing near Higashi-Obama, Kyoto, and Matsuiyamate).
- Kyūshū Shinkansen (West Kyūshū Route) : Shin-Tosu — Takeo-Onsen: 51 km.

Under the Seibi Shinkansen framework, it is stipulated that construction cannot be commenced unless the following five conditions are satisfied:

- Securing a stable outlook for financial resources
- Financial viability
- Cost–benefit performance
- Consent of the JR company as the operating entity
- Consent of the affected local governments regarding the separation of heikō zairaisen (parallel conventional lines)

As will be discussed in detail later, several route options have been considered for each of the two remaining sections. However, for these remaining sections, many of the proposed routes yield unfavorable figures in terms of financial viability and cost–benefit performance, partly due to the recent surge in construction costs.

In addition, under the Seibi Shinkansen scheme, a portion of the construction cost is to be borne by local governments along the route. However, this cost allocation is not based on the degree of benefit received by each prefecture, but rather on a strictly territorial basis. In other words, even if a given prefecture has limited need for the line, it is still required to bear (a portion of) the construction cost for the section passing through its territory. As a result, such prefectures tend to be reluctant toward those route options (e.g., Shiga Prefecture in the Maibara Route proposal for the Hokuriku Shinkansen).

Furthermore, under the Seibi Shinkansen scheme, the separation of heikō zairaisen—whereby they are transferred to third-sector railway companies funded by local governments—is permitted. This creates the possibility that a prefecture may be required not only to bear the construction costs of a Shinkansen line it does not need, but also to assume responsibility for loss-making conventional lines (e.g., Saga Prefecture in the case of the Nishi Kyūshū Shinkansen). As a result, the condition of obtaining the consent of all affected local governments has become a particularly high hurdle for many current route proposals.

In addition, since the division and privatization of Japanese National Railways, each JR company has continued to operate as a completely separate corporation, and their interests do not necessarily align. As a result, for example, if a route proposal involves through-running onto another Shinkansen line operated by a different JR company partway along the route, obtaining the consent of the JR company designated as the operating entity can become difficult, since the revenue from that section would effectively accrue to the other company.

==== Hokuriku Shinkansen extension ====
Route plans of the Tsuruga — Shin-Osaka section as of 2026

The section of Hokuriku Shinkansen between Tsuruga — Shin-Osaka remain unstarted. Up to this point, various route options for this section have been considered. The following are the main proposed routes.

- Maibara Route (米原ルート, Maibara Rūto): A route that runs south from Tsuruga Station along the eastern side of Lake Biwa in Shiga Prefecture, roughly following the Hokuriku Main Line, and connects to the Tōkaidō Shinkansen at Maibara Station.
- Kosei Route (湖西ルート, Kosei Rūto): A route that runs south from Tsuruga Station along the western side of Lake Biwa, following the Kosei Line, and reaches Kyoto Station.
- Obama Route (小浜ルート, Obama Rūto): Also known as Kameoka Route (亀岡ルート, Kameoka Rūto). A route that proceeds westward from Tsuruga along the Wakasa Bay coast in Fukui Prefecture, passes through Obama City (Higashi-Obama), then turns south to traverse Kyoto Prefecture, passing via Kameoka before reaching Shin-Ōsaka.
- Obama–Kyoto Route (小浜・京都ルート, Obama-Kyōto Rūto): Like the Obama Route, this route turns south from Obama into Kyoto Prefecture, but instead of passing through Kameoka, it goes via Kyoto Station before reaching Shin-Osaka. This route began to be considered from 2015 onward.
- Maizuru Route (舞鶴ルート, Maizuru Rūto): A route that runs from Tsuruga via Obama, then further west to Maizuru City, before turning south toward Kyoto (or Kameoka) and Shin-Osaka. This was also a route proposal added in 2015.

At first, the Maibara Route was considered, but it was soon replaced by the Obama Route, and by the time the Seibi Shinkansen plan was formulated in 1972, this was the route that had been envisioned. (The Maibara Route remained as a separate plan under the name "Hokuriku–Chūkyō Shinkansen", distinct from the Hokuriku Shinkansen.)

In addition, at one point, a plan was also considered to use a Free Gauge Train (FGT) via the Kosei Route. (Note: In Japan, Shinkansen lines use 1,435 mm standard gauge, while JR conventional lines use 1,067 mm narrow gauge, so normal trains cannot operate through services between them as they are.) However, at a meeting between the government, the ruling parties, and JR West on August 24, 2018, it was decided to abandon the introduction of FGT, citing "technical difficulties and delays in development".

Ultimately, in 2016, it was decided that development would proceed based on the Obama–Kyoto Route, which modified the previous Obama Route by changing the line's passage through Kyoto Prefecture from Kameoka to Kyoto. The following year, in 2017, it was further decided that the section between Kyoto and Shin-Osaka would follow the so-called Southern Route (南回りルート, Minami-mawari Rūto), passing via Matsuiyamate Station in the southern part of Kyoto Prefecture.

There have also been proposals regarding the Osaka-side terminus, including locating it at Tennōji instead of Shin-Osaka, or extending the line further to Kansai International Airport. However, in April 2016, a ruling party committee formally decided that the Osaka-side terminus would be Shin-Osaka.

As a result of these processes, the route of the Hokuriku Shinkansen west of Tsuruga was determined to follow the Obama–Kyoto Route, and from Kyoto Station it would proceed to Shin-Osaka via the Southern Route passing through Matsuiyamate.

However, even as of April 2026—ten years after the route for the extension section was decided as the Obama–Kyoto Route—construction on this section has yet to begin. In the process of examining the detailed alignment, it has become clear that costs will be significantly higher than initially expected and that the construction period will be longer. Furthermore, opposition movements against this route also began to emerge, particularly in Kyoto (discussed later).

Amid these developments, there has been some movement calling for a reconsideration of the once-decided route. Some organizations, including Ishikawa Prefecture and Japan Innovation Party (JIP), support the Maibara Route instead.

On December 15, 2025, following a change in the ruling coalition framework from LDP–Komeito alliance to one between LDP and JIP, LDP agreed to examine eight proposals (Note: The eight proposals are: the Obama–Kyoto Route; the Kameoka Route (Obama Route); the Maibara Route with through operation onto the Tōkaidō Shinkansen; the Maibara Route with transfers to the Tōkaidō Shinkansen; the Kosei Route; the Kosei Route utilizing the existing conventional line; the Maizuru Route via Kyoto; and the Maizuru Route via Kameoka.) advocated by JIP. From 2026 onward, hearings will be conducted with the operating company JR West and local governments along the line, and a request will be made to MLIT to recalculate the cost-effectiveness.

However, as outlined below, each of the proposed routes has its own advantages and disadvantages, and the reality is that even if the Obama–Kyoto Route has problems, the alternative options cannot be chosen easily either:

- Maibara Route: This route is geographically a highly rational one, and it continues to have a certain level of support. Extending the line only as far as Maibara would make the route significantly shorter and reduce construction costs. Another advantage is that access to the Chūkyō region (Nagoya) would also be excellent from Maibara.

On the other hand, the fatal problem with this route is that terminating at Maibara presupposes through service onto the Tōkaidō Shinkansen beyond that point. In the 1970s, the Tōkaidō Shinkansen still had spare capacity in its timetable, and both the Hokuriku Shinkansen and the Tōkaidō Shinkansen were expected to be operated by the same entity, JNR, so no major issues with through service were anticipated. However, as of 2026, the Tōkaidō Shinkansen is already operating at virtually full capacity, with trains running at extremely high frequency and the timetable already heavily saturated. In addition, while the Tōkaidō Shinkansen uses a train operation management system known as COMTRAC, the Hokuriku Shinkansen uses COSMOS, a completely different system that was newly developed. Therefore, if through service operations were to be introduced, it would be necessary to develop rolling stock compatible with both systems, and such trains could furthermore pose operational safety risks. Considering these factors, introducing new through services onto the Tōkaidō Shinkansen at this stage would be extremely difficult. On the other hand, if through services are abandoned and passengers are required to transfer at Maibara, the level of convenience would be little different from the current situation, where passengers transfer to conventional limited express trains at Tsuruga.
Furthermore, unlike in the time of JNR, the Tōkaidō Shinkansen is now operated by JR Central, while the Hokuriku Shinkansen section in question belongs to JR West, a different company altogether. In other words, whether through service is introduced or passengers are simply required to transfer, relying on the Tōkaidō Shinkansen between Maibara and Shin-Osaka would mean that the revenue from this section would be lost from JR West. For these reasons, JR West has expressed a negative view of this route. In addition, Shiga Prefecture—which would see relatively limited benefits from the Hokuriku Shinkansen—has been reluctant to support construction under the conventional framework that requires financial contributions from local governments along the route. Also, Fukui Prefecture strongly advocates for the Hokuriku Shinkansen to pass through Obama, and therefore opposes any route that does not include Obama.

- Kosei Route: The main advantage of this route is that it is more direct than routes via Maibara or Obama, making it the shortest distance between Tsuruga and Kyoto. However, if the plan relies on the use of existing conventional lines, high speeds cannot be achieved, so the travel time would in fact become the longest of all the options. If a full-standard Shinkansen line were to be constructed instead, the total construction length would be greater than that of the Maibara Route.

Originally, this plan was to utilize the existing Kosei Line as it is and operate FGT, which would have kept construction costs very low. However, since the FGT concept has been abandoned, the current plan—like the other routes—is to construct a full-standard Shinkansen line. That said, among the eight proposals put forward by JIP in December 2025, there is also an option to "utilize the existing conventional line". This is understood to refer to a plan to convert the existing Kosei Line to standard gauge or to install a dual gauge system, allowing Mini-Shinkansen-style through operations. However, carrying out such construction on the Kosei Line—which connects to the major city of Kyoto and operates far more frequent services than lines like those to Yamagata or Akita—is expected to be difficult.
Regardless of whether a full-standard Shinkansen or a conventional-line-based solution is adopted, the route beyond Kyoto Station remains unclear. If the plan is to use the Tōkaidō Shinkansen beyond that point, the same issues of through operation or transfers as with the Maibara Route would be unavoidable. Also, as with the Maibara Route, cooperation from Shiga Prefecture cannot be expected, and opposition from Fukui Prefecture is anticipated. In addition, this area is known for strong winds called "Hira-oroshi", increasing the risk of service disruptions.

- Obama Route: As mentioned above, this is the route that was envisioned in the original plan. One advantage of this route is that, unlike the Maibara Route or the Kosei Route, it does not pass through Shiga Prefecture, meaning there is no need to take Shiga's position into account. In addition, Fukui Prefecture has been seeking to have the Shinkansen pass through Obama in order to promote development in the western part of the prefecture. Furthermore, because this route does not involve through service onto, or transfers to, the Tōkaidō Shinkansen, those issues do not arise.

On the other hand, this route makes a detour as far as Obama before turning south, which increases the construction distance compared with the Maibara and Kosei routes, and consequently raises both construction costs and the time required for completion. In addition, the line would have to pass through the sparsely populated mountainous areas of northern Kyoto Prefecture by means of long tunnels, which would further increase costs. Moreover, Nantan City in northern Kyoto, through which this route would pass by tunnel, has expressed concerns about the construction of the Shinkansen due to fears of environmental degradation, and has stated that it will not permit the installation of tunnel access shafts within the city.
The difference between this route and the Obama–Kyoto Route described below is whether the line passes via Kameoka Station or Kyoto Station. If it goes via Kameoka, construction is expected to be easier than in the Kyoto alignment. Also, Kameoka City has expressed support for this route. On the other hand, because it does not pass through the major city and tourist destination of Kyoto, demand would likely be lower, making its overall benefits the smallest among the options.

- Obama-Kyoto Route: As noted above, although it has been decided that construction will proceed on the basis of this route, work has still not begun even now. This route is based on the Obama Route, with the intermediate stop changed to the more convenient Kyoto Station. Its advantages are likewise similar to those of the Obama Route: it passes through Obama without going through Shiga Prefecture, and it does not require through service onto the Tōkaidō Shinkansen.

On the other hand, construction work in the area around Kyoto Station is expected to be considerably more difficult. Also, in Kyoto, concerns have been raised about the impact on groundwater by tunnels, particularly because the Fushimi area along the route is traditionally known for sake brewing. As a result, local politicians, local media, as well as the Kyoto Buddhist Association (which even criticized the route as "a folly for a thousand years") have strongly opposed the route passing through Kyoto. In addition, this route would still pass through Nantan City, so that issue likewise remains a problem.
In August 2024, a more detailed alignment proposal for this route was released by the MLIT. In that proposal, three route options were presented for the area around Kyoto Station, all of which avoid the Fushimi area by means of sharp curves. One option would run through Kyoto Station on an east–west alignment, another on a north–south alignment, and the third would use Katsuragawa Station in the Kyoto suburban area instead of Kyoto Station. Of these, the first two would involve very high construction costs, while the Katsuragawa option would reduce convenience for passengers.

- Maizuru Route: This route has the advantage of connecting the northern and southern parts of Kyoto Prefecture, and is supported by areas such as Maizuru. However, because it would involve a significant detour, construction costs would increase and the project would likely take longer to complete. The resulting route would also have longer travel times and higher fares. Moreover, if it passes through Kyoto Station, it cannot avoid the same environmental concerns as the Obama–Kyoto route, while if the route were to bypass Kyoto Station, it would have even worse cost-effectiveness than the Obama Route. In either case, the route will pass through Nantan as well.

Each of these routes has its own advantages and disadvantages, and JR West continues to support the once-selected Obama–Kyoto Route.

==== Kyūshū Shinkansen extension ====
The Kyūshū Shinkansen (West Kyūshū Route) experienced significant delays due to the prolonged development and cancellation of the FGT, a variable gauge train that was initially planned for introduction on the line. As a result, the originally scheduled opening, set for fiscal year 2022, was officially postponed to fiscal year 2025 or later. Subsequently, as an interim measure, the MLIT adopted a "relay system", under which conventional limited express trains operate between Hakata — Shin-Tosu — Takeo-Onsen, while Shinkansen trains operate between Takeo-Onsen — Nagasaki. The latter section opened as the Nishi Kyūshū Shinkansen on September 23, 2022.

The section between Shin-Tosu — Takeo-Onsen remain unstarted. Saga Prefecture, the prefecture along this section, is already located sufficiently close to the major city of Fukuoka and has never considered a full-standard Shinkansen to be necessary. Rather, it is concerned about potential declines in service on heikō zairaisen (parallel conventional lines) and the financial burden on local governments resulting from the separation of JR operations if a Seibi Shinkansen is built. For this reason, Saga Prefecture had taken the position that it would only accept an FGT operating on conventional lines. However, since the FGT plan has now been abandoned, the national government and Nagasaki Prefecture are seeking to complete the section between Shin-Tosu — Takeo-Onsen as a full-standard Shinkansen line. Saga Prefecture, however, has never requested a full-standard Shinkansen and does not consider it necessary even now. As a result, a conflict has arisen, with Saga Prefecture arguing that "this differs from what was originally agreed in the past".

The national government (the MLIT) and Saga Prefecture have held several rounds of the "Broad Consultations" (幅広い協議) on this issue since June 2020. In these discussions, Saga Prefecture reaffirmed its position that it had not accepted the construction of the line to full Shinkansen standards. However, on that basis, regarding the following three proposals put forward by the Railway Bureau of the MLIT, Saga Prefecture proposed that the national government examine whether any of them contained points worthy of consideration by the prefecture:

- Northern Route (北回りルート, Kita-mawari Rūto): Passing through the northern part of Saga City.
- Saga Station Route (佐賀駅ルート, Saga Eki Rūto): Passing through central Saga and connecting to the conventional Saga Station. This route had effectively been the assumed option under previous basic plans. (Note: This route had already completed environmental assessment before the conflict between Saga Prefecture and the national government became explicit, and is sometimes referred to as the Assessment Route (アセスルート, Asesu Rūto), though Saga Prefecture opposes this designation.)
- Southern Route (南回りルート, Minami-mawari Rūto): Branching from Chikugo-Funagoya Station (Fukuoka), running through the southern part of Saga along the Ariake Sea coast, and passing Saga Airport.

Of these options, the Southern Route has attracted interest from the Kurume Chamber of Commerce and Industry. However, the MLIT considers it "technically difficult". Since passing near Saga Airport along the coastline would require bridges or tunnels, construction is deemed challenging due to height restrictions around the airport, as well as concerns about impacts on fisheries and safety. In addition, JR Kyūshū has stated that, considering that the Southern Route would also impose financial burdens on Fukuoka Prefecture, the Saga Station Route is the most preferable among the three options.

== Funding ==
The Tōhoku and Jōetsu Shinkansen lines were constructed using JNR's own funds and loans from the Fiscal Investment and Loan Program (FILP), which ultimately contributed to the ballooning of JNR's debt. Reflecting on this experience, the subsequent Seibi Shinkansen lines were built in principle as public works projects financed by non-repayable funds from the national and local governments. Accordingly, each section of the Seibi Shinkansen is owned by the Japan Railway Construction, Transport and Technology Agency (JRTT), an independent administrative agency under the Ministry of Land, Infrastructure, Transport and Tourism (MLIT), while the JR companies operate the trains by paying track usage fees to reflect the benefits they gained after the line's opening.

However, the Ministry of Finance (formerly the Ministry of Finance and Treasury) strongly resisted increases in public works spending, meaning that every new construction start or schedule acceleration required the identification of new funding sources.

=== Old funding scheme ===
When construction began on the Hokuriku Shinkansen (Takasaki — Karuizawa section) in 1989, the following cost-sharing arrangement was established:

- JR Companies: 50%

Funded through track usage fees from Seibi Shinkansen, and from the surplus lease revenue remaining after the Shinkansen Holding Corporation used the proceeds from leasing existing Shinkansen lines (Tōkaidō, Sanyō, Tōhoku, and Jōetsu) to repay JNR's old debts.

- National Government (Public Works, etc.): 35%

Type I construction (railway infrastructure such as tracks and major facilities): 40%
Type II construction (railway facilities closely related to regional convenience, such as stations): 25%

- Local Governments: 15%

Type I construction: 10%
Type II construction: 25%

The local contribution was, in principle, borne by prefectural governments, of which 90% could be financed through local government bonds. The remaining 10% could be charged to municipalities along the route. (This rule remained unchanged under the new funding scheme as well.)

In 1990, as the sale of the existing Shinkansen lines to JR East, JR Central, and JR West was scheduled for the following year, a special funding source for the Seibi Shinkansen projects was established. Specifically, ¥1.1 trillion—the amount added through the asset revaluation accompanying the transfer—was designated as a special revenue source. From this, ¥72 billion per year was allocated to both the national government and the JR companies (as a replacement for the surplus from the lease revenues of the existing Shinkansen lines).

As an exception, the Hokuriku Shinkansen (Takasaki — Nagano section) received ¥278 billion in FILP funds, which are repayable, in order to ensure the line opened in time for the Nagano Winter Olympics. Since opening, the loan repayments have been made using track usage fees from the operational sections of the Tōhoku and Kyūshū Shinkansen lines, meaning that very little of these fees could be used toward new construction costs. However, with the enactment of the Amended JNR Debt Settlement Act (改正国鉄債務処理法) on June 8, 2011, debts were repaid using the retained earnings from the special accounts of the JRTT. As a result, the funds that had been used for debt repayment could now be redirected toward construction costs.

=== New funding scheme ===
In 1996, with the launch of construction on three sections of three Shinkansen lines, the cost-sharing framework among the national government, local governments, and the JR companies was revised as follows:

- JR Companies:

Responsible for paying track usage fees and related costs, limited to the extent of their operational benefit.

- National Government:

Covers two-thirds of the remaining cost (after subtracting JR's portion), funded through public works expenditures and proceeds from the transfer of existing Shinkansen lines (including portions previously attributed to JR under the old scheme)

- Local Governments:

Cover one-third of the remaining cost (after subtracting JR's portion). Of this, 90% may be financed through local bonds, and when repaying these bonds, 50–70% of the combined principal and interest is covered by local allocation tax grants, proportional to each region's standard financial scale. (This system redistributes funds saved through the expiration of the 50% property tax reduction previously granted to JR East, JR Central, and JR West.) As a result, the effective local burden is approximately 12–18% of the total construction cost.

At the end of 2004, the government and ruling coalition agreed to accelerate the use of revenue from the sale of existing Shinkansen assets, applying funds originally scheduled for use after fiscal 2013 to ongoing construction projects.

Furthermore, during profitability simulations for the Hokuriku Shinkansen (Toyama — Kanazawa) and Hokkaidō Shinkansen (Shin-Aomori — Shin-Hakodate-Hokuto), it was found that JR East, which would operate trains across company boundaries, would gain significant additional profits—estimated at ¥39 billion per year for the Hokuriku Shinkansen and ¥22 billion per year for the Hokkaidō Shinkansen. Consequently, a policy was introduced requiring JR East to bear a portion of these "base benefits (根元受益)" as part of the financial contribution. Although JR East initially resisted this arrangement, subsequent negotiations with the JRTT resulted in an increase in track usage fees upon the opening of the Shin-Aomori — Shin-Hakodate-Hokuto section.

Construction costs for the Seibi Shinkansen lines (Unit: billion yen)
1989	6.3
1990	21.1
1991	37.3
1992	129.6
1993	192.2
1994	194.2
1995	254.8
1996	172.5
1997	148.2
1998	189.9
1999	237.9
2000	275.3
2001	291.6
2002	238.0
2003	207.2
2004	220.7
2005	225.3
2006	250.9
2007	268.7
2008	317.8
2009	366.6
2010	251.0

Construction costs for the Seibi Shinkansen lines by JRTT (Unit: billion yen)
FY	Total cost
2007	-	71.4 / 72.4 / 88.0
2008	-	79.7 / 72.4 / 103.7
2009	-	109.0 / 72.4 / 118.5
2010	-	100.9 / 72.4 / 107.8
2011	-	76.1 / 72.4 / 86.0
2012	-	67.4 / 72.4 / 81.3
2018	225.3	73.5 / 47.7
2019	226.6	90.9 / 51.2
2020	225.4	90.7 / 54.7
2021	231.2	77.8 / 55.2
2022	233.4	84.1 / 53.4
2023	242.1	81.0 / 53.9
2024	227.5	80.4 / 45.2

Red: National government subsidies granted to JRTT in the corresponding fiscal year for Seibi Shinkansen project expenses.
Purple: Funds for Seibi Shinkansen projects derived from the proceeds of existing Shinkansen transfers.
Green: Financial contributions from local governments toward Shinkansen railway development project costs.

== The heikō zairaisen issue ==
For the Seibi Shinkansen lines, by agreement between the local governments along the route and JR, the heikō zairaisen (並行在来線; "parallel conventional lines") —existing conventional railway lines running along the same corridor, are to be separated from JR's management and either converted into third-sector railways (jointly funded by local governments and private entities) or discontinued. This measure aims to reduce JR's management burden, as it would be financially difficult for JR to operate both the costly new Shinkansen facilities and the local conventional lines that would lose traffic and become underused after the Shinkansen's opening. However, there are some sections that have remained under JR management. According to the "Government–Ruling Party Agreement on the Handling of Shinkansen Development Lines (整備新幹線の取扱いについて 政府与党合意)" dated December 25, 1996, it was confirmed that "For the sections of the Seibi Shinkansen lines to be newly constructed, the corresponding heikō zairaisen shall, as before, be separated from JR management upon the opening of the Shinkansen". Thus, the same measure is planned for the heikō zairaisen corresponding to Shinkansen sections yet to open. For these heikō zairaisen, key challenges include how to maintain service for local passengers, how to handle freight train operations and branch lines connected to the parallel lines, and how to ensure the financial viability of the new third-sector operators. As of the opening of the Hokuriku Shinkansen section between Kanazawa — Tsuruga in 2024, the only heikō zairaisen that has been fully discontinued is the section of the Shinetsu Main Line between Yokokawa — Karuizawa.

List of heikō zairaisen of the Seibi Shinkansen lines (excluding sections not yet under construction)
Seibi Shinkansen	Before Shinkansen opening		Section	Operating distance	Date of transfer/abolition	After Shinkansen opening
Hokkaidō Shinkansen	JR East	Tsugaru Line	Aomori — Mimmaya	55.8		Remains under JR East management (Shinkansen and conventional line are managed by different JR companies)
Hokkaidō Shinkansen	JR Hokkaidō	Kaikyō Line	Naka-Oguni — Kikonai	87.8		Remains under JR Hokkaidō management (regular passenger services discontinued; only freight trains and cruise-style tourist trains operate)
Hokkaidō Shinkansen	JR Hokkaidō	Esashi Line	Kikonai — Goryōkaku	37.8	March 26, 2016	Transferred to South Hokkaidō Railway (electrification retained; regular passenger services operated with diesel trains)
Hokkaidō Shinkansen	JR Hokkaidō	Hakodate Main Line	Hakodate — Shin-Hakodate-Hokuto	17.9	FY2030	Remained under JR Hokkaidō after opening of Shin-Aomori — Shin-Hakodate-Hokuto section; to be separated from JR Hokkaidō after opening of Shin-Hakodate-Hokuto — Sapporo section
Hokkaidō Shinkansen	JR Hokkaidō	Hakodate Main Line	Shin-Hakodate-Hokuto — Oshamambe; Ōnuma — Shikabe — Mori	129.7	FY2030	Scheduled for separation from JR Hokkaidō management; future handling undecided as of 2026
Hokkaidō Shinkansen	JR Hokkaidō	Hakodate Main Line	Oshamambe — Otaru	140.2	FY2030	Scheduled for abolition (to be replaced by bus service)
Hokkaidō Shinkansen	JR Hokkaidō	Hakodate Main Line	Otaru — Sapporo	33.8		Planned to remain under JR Hokkaidō management
Tōhoku Shinkansen	JR East	Tōhoku Main Line	Morioka — Metoki	82.0	December 1, 2002	Transferred to IGR Iwate Galaxy Railway
Tōhoku Shinkansen	JR East	Tōhoku Main Line	Metoki — Hachinohe	25.9	December 1, 2002	Transferred to Aomori Prefecture and Aoimori Railway (vertical separation model)
Tōhoku Shinkansen	JR East	Tōhoku Main Line	Hachinohe — Aomori	96.0	December 4, 2010	Transferred to Aomori Prefecture and Aoimori Railway (vertical separation model)
Hokuriku Shinkansen	JR East	Shinetsu Main Line	Takasaki — Yokokawa	29.7		Remains under JR East management
Hokuriku Shinkansen	JR East	Shinetsu Main Line	Yokokawa — Karuizawa	11.2	October 1, 1997	Abolished (replaced by JR Bus Kantō's Usui Line bus service)
Hokuriku Shinkansen	JR East	Shinetsu Main Line	Karuizawa — Shinonoi	65.1	October 1, 1997	Transferred to Shinano Railway
Hokuriku Shinkansen	JR East	Shinetsu Main Line	Shinonoi — Nagano	9.3		Remains under JR East management
Hokuriku Shinkansen	JR East	Shinetsu Main Line	Nagano — Myōkō-Kōgen	37.3	March 14, 2015	Transferred to Shinano Railway
Hokuriku Shinkansen	JR East	Shinetsu Main Line	Myōkō-Kōgen — Naoetsu	37.7	March 14, 2015	Transferred to Echigo Tokimeki Railway
Hokuriku Shinkansen	JR West	Hokuriku Main Line	Naoetsu — Ichiburi	59.3	March 14, 2015	Transferred to Echigo Tokimeki Railway (electrification retained; regular passenger trains operated by diesel units)
Hokuriku Shinkansen	JR West	Hokuriku Main Line	Ichiburi — Kurikara	100.1	March 14, 2015	Transferred to Ainokaze Toyama Railway
Hokuriku Shinkansen	JR West	Hokuriku Main Line	Kurikara — Kanazawa	17.8	March 14, 2015	Transferred to IR Ishikawa Railway
Hokuriku Shinkansen	JR West	Hokuriku Main Line	Kanazawa — Daishōji	46.4	March 16, 2024	Transferred to IR Ishikawa Railway
Hokuriku Shinkansen	JR West	Hokuriku Main Line	Daishōji — Tsuruga	84.3	March 16, 2024	Transferred to Hapi-Line Fukui
Kyūshū Shinkansen (Kagoshima Route)	JR Kyūshū	Kagoshima Main Line	Hakata — Yatsushiro	154.1		Remains under JR Kyūshū management
Kyūshū Shinkansen (Kagoshima Route)	JR Kyūshū	Kagoshima Main Line	Yatsushiro — Sendai	116.9	March 13, 2004	Transferred to Hisatsu Orange Railway (electrification retained; regular passenger trains operated by diesel units)
Kyūshū Shinkansen (Kagoshima Route)	JR Kyūshū	Kagoshima Main Line	Sendai — Nishi-Kagoshima	46.1		Remains under JR Kyūshū management
Kyūshū Shinkansen (West Kyūshū Route)	JR Kyūshū	Nagasaki Main Line	Hizen-Yamaguchi — Isahaya Station	60.8	September 23, 2022	For 23 years after opening, operates under a vertical separation model: the facilities are managed by the Saga–Nagasaki Railway Management Center (佐賀・長崎鉄道管理センター) (jointly funded by Saga and Nagasaki Prefectures), while JR Kyūshū operates the trains. Electrification between Hizen-Hama — Isahaya has been discontinued.
Kyūshū Shinkansen (West Kyūshū Route)	JR Kyūshū	Nagasaki Main Line	Isahaya — Ichibu — Nagasaki; Kikitsu — Nagayo — Urakami	48.4		Remains under JR Kyūshū management (electrification discontinued)

=== Hokkaidō Shinkansen ===
In preparation for the opening of the section between Shin-Aomori — Shin-Hakodate-Hokuto, one major issue concerned how to handle the Esashi Line. While it had been agreed that the section between Kikonai — Goryōkaku, which runs parallel to the Shinkansen line, would be separated from JR management, the non-electrified section between Kikonai — Esashi, which does not run parallel to the Shinkansen line, would have become a line disconnected from the rest of the JR's conventional network. Moreover, it was one of the sections within JR Hokkaido's area with extremely low passenger numbers. For these reasons, this section was abolished on May 12, 2014.

Meanwhile, in August 2014, the South Hokkaidō Parallel Conventional Line Preparation Company (北海道道南地域並行在来線準備株式会社) (the predecessor of South Hokkaidō Railway) was established. With the opening of the Hokkaidō Shinkansen on March 26, 2016, the section between Kikonai — Goryōkaku was transferred to South Hokkaidō Railway.

As for the Tsugaru Line, Aomori Prefecture expressed the view that "since JR East operates the Tsugaru Line and JR Hokkaidō operates the Hokkaidō Shinkansen, the line is not subject to separation". JR East also confirmed in 2004 that the line would not be separated from its management.

However, after a torrential rain disaster in August 2022, the section between Kanita — Minmaya was rendered impassable. Because restoration costs are estimated at a minimum of 600 million yen, discussions have begun on the possibility of abolishing the closed section. Subsequently, in March 2025, Aomori Prefecture, JR East, and the municipalities along the line agreed to discontinue passenger railway services between Kanita — Minmaya in April 2027 and convert the route to road-based transportation. (However, the section between Kanita Station — Shin-Naka-Oguni Signal Station will remain in operation as a freight line.)

==== Hakodate Main Line ====
The section between Hakodate — Shin-Hakodate-Hokuto is used by the Hakodate Liner, a shuttle service providing access between the new station on the Hokkaidō Shinkansen and the central conventional station in Hakodate. Hakodate City and the Hakodate Chamber of Commerce and Industry requested that this section not be separated from JR Hokkaidō 's management and that JR Hokkaidō continue to operate it even after the Shinkansen is extended to Sapporo.

In response, JR Hokkaidō announced that it would continue to operate the section between Otaru — Sapporo, but it did not indicate any policy to continue operation of the section between Shin-Hakodate-Hokuto — Hakodate. JR Hokkaidō also stated that agreement on the separation of management for the Hakodate — Otaru section was an indispensable condition for the authorization and commencement of construction of the Shinkansen extension. As a result, the local governments along the line, including Hakodate City, ultimately agreed to the separation of management for this section.

On February 3, 2022, it was decided that within the Hakodate — Otaru section, the portion between Oshamambe — Yoichi would be abolished and replaced by bus service, as maintaining the railway would cause significant financial losses due to high maintenance costs. The discontinuation of a heikō zairaisen following the opening of a new Shinkansen section marks the second such case, after the closure of the Yokokawa — Karuizawa section of the Shinetsu Main Line when the Hokuriku Shinkansen (Takasaki — Nagano) opened on October 1, 1997.

Meanwhile, regarding the section between Yoichi — Otaru, Yoichi Town, where many residents commute to and from Otaru, insisted on maintaining railway operations through a third-sector railway. However, discussions with Otaru City, which also considered bus conversion, did not reach an agreement, and the decision was postponed. Eventually, on March 26, 2022, Hokkaidō Prefecture, Otaru City, and Yoichi Town reached an agreement to convert the section to bus service. The following day, on March 27, Hokkaidō and the nine municipalities along the line agreed to the abolition and bus conversion of the entire Oshamambe — Otaru section.

=== Tōhoku Shinkansen ===
On December 1, 2002, the section between Morioka — Hachinohe opened, and management of the corresponding section of the Tōhoku Main Line between Morioka — Metoki was transferred to the third-sector railway operator IGR Iwate Galaxy Railway (Category-1 Railway Business Operator (Note: A railway operator that owns its own infrastructure and operates train services.)), while the section between Metoki — Hachinohe was transferred to Aomori Prefecture (Category-3 Railway Business Operator (Note: An entity that owns railway infrastructure but does not operate train services itself.)) and Aoimori Railway (Category-2 Railway Business Operator (Note: An operator that does not own railway infrastructure and runs trains on facilities owned by other entities.)). Later, on December 4, 2010, the line was extended from Hachinohe to Shin-Aomori Station, and the section of the Tōhoku Main Line between Hachinohe — Aomori was also transferred to Aomori Prefecture and Aoimori Railway.

This section serves as a major logistics artery connecting the Kantō region and Hokkaidō . During the management transfer, the local governments and new operators requested an increase in track usage fees paid by JR Freight, which operates as a Category-2 Railway Business Operator on this section. They argued that the section maintains double-tracked and electrified infrastructure primarily for freight operations, facilities considered excessive in scale for the level of passenger service, and thus demanded that JR Freight abandon the "avoidable cost" method (Note: In Japan, when freight rolling stock operated by JR Freight runs on railway lines owned by other companies, a track usage fee based on the "avoidable cost" method is applied. Under this system, the passenger railway company calculates the maintenance costs that would have been required if freight trains did not operate. It then determines how much additional maintenance cost results from the operation of freight trains, and JR Freight pays only this incremental amount. This method was established during the Japanese National Railways privatization because JR Freight was expected to have a weak financial base. The system was designed to keep track access charges low in order to support the company's financial viability.) and instead pay usage fees that also reflect the maintenance burden of these additional facilities.

After discussions among the relevant parties, it was decided that the Japan Railway Construction Public Corporation—the special corporation that built the Shinkansen section (later reorganized as the Japan Railway Construction, Transport and Technology Agency)—would use part of the track usage fees it receives from JR East for Shinkansen operations to subsidize JR Freight's track usage payments. This arrangement has since been applied to later Shinkansen projects as well, with its validity set to continue until JR Freight is fully privatized.

Until the opening of the Hokkaidō Shinkansen in 2016, the overnight limited express trains Hokutosei and Cassiopeia, which operated between Ueno — Sapporo, continued running as through services operated jointly with JR lines.

Although the Ōminato Line and Hachinohe Line became "isolated" lines without direct connections to JR East's other conventional line network, the rolling stock used on these lines continued to be shared through the operation of interconnected (through-running) trains, even after the management transfer.

In the past, these lines also served as transfer routes for rolling stock being sent to factories in Akita or Kōriyama for maintenance or overhaul. However, after the division of JR's lines, these transfer routes were broken up, forcing trains that previously could be moved entirely within the Tōhoku region to take long detours via the Greater Tokyo Area and other regions.

=== Hokuriku Shinkansen ===
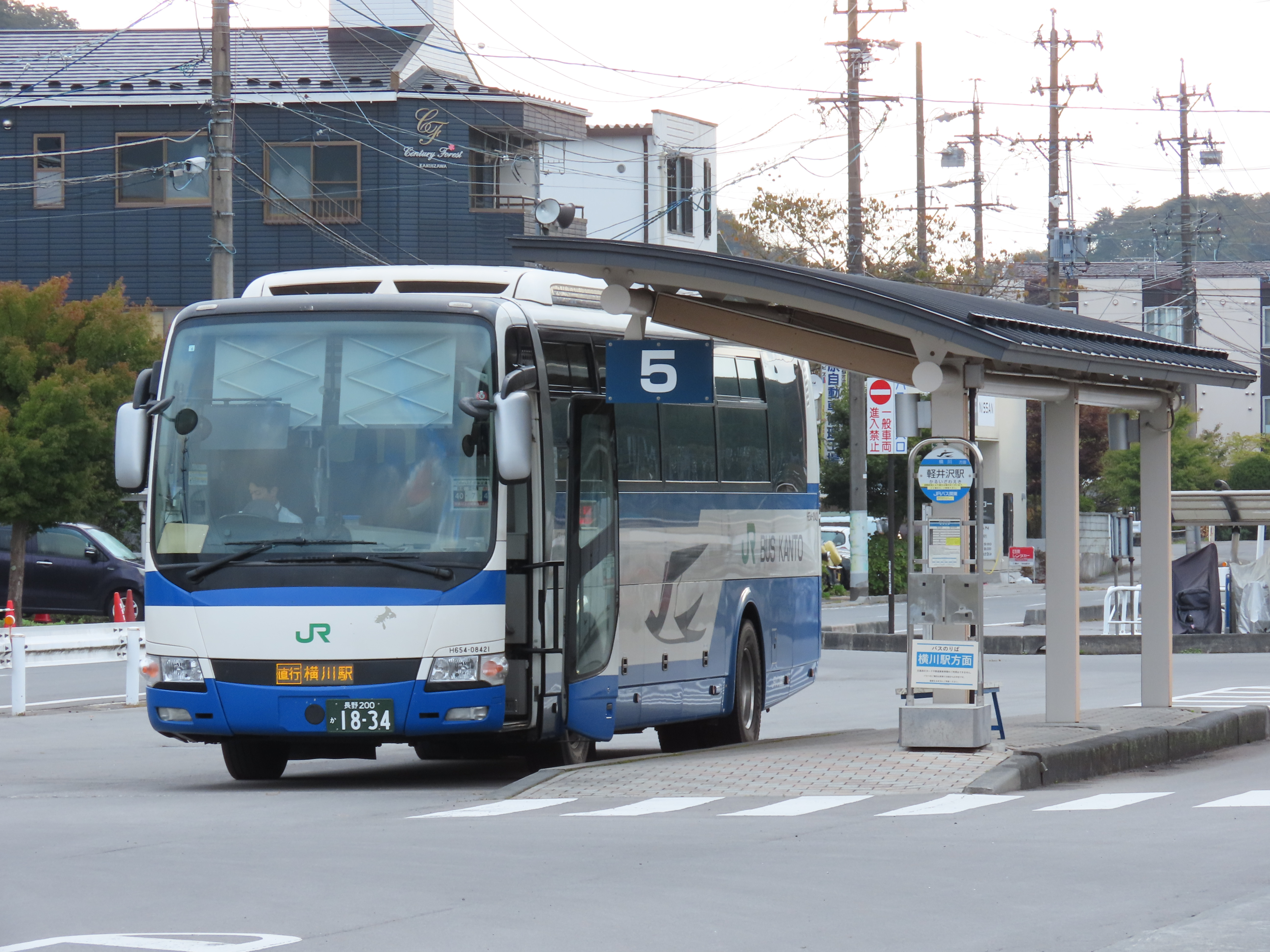
The section between Yokokawa — Karuizawa on the Shinetsu Main Line was replaced by bus services operated by JR Bus Kantō.

With the opening of the section between Takasaki — Nagano (the so-called Nagano Shinkansen) on October 1, 1997, part of the Shinetsu Main Line was reorganized as follows: the Takasaki — Yokokawa section remained under JR East's operation; the Yokokawa — Karuizawa section was abolished; and the Karuizawa — Shinonoi section was transferred to the newly established Shinano Railway, a third-sector railway company. This became the first case of heikō zairaisen separation accompanying the opening of a Shinkansen line. The Shinonoi — Nagano section continued to be operated by JR East, as it plays a vital role in the transport network, with many trains from the Shinonoi Line running through to Nagano.

When the Nagano — Kanazawa section opened on March 14, 2015, parts of the Shinetsu Main Line and Hokuriku Main Line were transferred as follows:

- In Nagano Prefecture, the Shinetsu Main Line (Nagano — Myōkō-Kōgen) section was transferred to Shinano Railway.
- In Niigata Prefecture, the Shinetsu Main Line (Myōkō-Kōgen — Naoetsu) and Hokuriku Main Line (Naoetsu — Ichiburi) sections were transferred to Echigo Tokimeki Railway.
- In Toyama Prefecture, the Hokuriku Main Line (Ichiburi — Kurikara) section was transferred to Ainokaze Toyama Railway.
- In Ishikawa Prefecture, the Hokuriku Main Line (Kurikara — Kanazawa) section was transferred to IR Ishikawa Railway.

At the time of the Kanazawa — Tsuruga section opening on March 16, 2024, management of the heikō zairaisen Hokuriku Main Line was again transferred: the Kanazawa — Daishōji section in Ishikawa Prefecture was taken over by IR Ishikawa Railway, while the Daishōji — Tsuruga section in Fukui Prefecture was transferred to Hapi-Line Fukui.

As for the Tsuruga — Shin-Osaka section, the Japan Railway Construction, Transport and Technology Agency (JRTT) published a preparatory environmental considerations report in May 2019 under the Environmental Impact Assessment Act (環境影響評価法), presenting an outline of the proposed route. However, the treatment of the heikō zairaisen for this future section remains undecided.

=== Kyūshū Shinkansen (Kagoshima Route) ===
With the opening of the section between Shin-Yatsushiro — Kagoshima-Chūō on March 13, 2004, management of the Kagoshima Main Line section between Yatsushiro — Sendai was transferred to the third-sector company Hisatsu Orange Railway. In this section, JR Freight continues to operate as a Category-2 Railway Business Operator (providing freight services on tracks owned by another company) and is also a shareholder in the new company, maintaining its freight operations.

Although electrification facilities were retained for freight train operations, this section—particularly the sparsely populated area near the Kumamoto–Kagoshima prefectural border—was converted to the use of light diesel multiple units (DMUs) to reduce passenger service operating costs. The overnight trains that had previously operated along this line were discontinued from entering the Hisatsu Orange Railway section; the Naha sleeper train, which used to run between Shin-Osaka — Nishi-Kagoshima Stations, had its service shortened to Kumamoto before being discontinued on March 15, 2008.

However, JR Kyūshū's cruise train Seven Stars in Kyūshū (operating since 2013) and the D&S train (excursion train) 36+3 (launched in 2020) both run through this section.

All other sections of the line remain under JR Kyūshū's direct management, as they are integral parts of the urban transport network and were therefore not separated.

=== Kyūshū Shinkansen (West Kyūshū Route) ===
For the Nagasaki Main Line section between Hizen-Yamaguchi — Isahaya, it was initially agreed that the railway would adopt a vertical separation model in which Saga Prefecture and Nagasaki Prefecture would own the railway infrastructure. Under this plan, JR Kyūshū would operate the section between Hizen-Yamaguchi — Hizen-Kashima, while a third-sector railway company jointly established by the two prefectures would manage operations between Hizen-Kashima — Isahaya.

However, due to opposition from some local municipalities along the line to the proposed management separation, the plan was later revised so that JR Kyūshū would continue to operate the entire section of the heikō zairaisen for 23 years following the opening of the Shinkansen.

That said, the vertical separation model itself remains in place, and the Saga–Nagasaki Railway Management Center (佐賀・長崎鉄道管理センター), jointly established by the two prefectures, owns the railway facilities. The section between Isahaya — Nagasaki remains under JR Kyūshū's direct management and is not separated.

Among these sections, the stretch between Hizen-Hama — Nagasaki has had its electrification facilities removed and is now operated with diesel multiple units (DMUs). This case represents the first instance of electrification facilities being dismantled on a heikō zairaisen.

== Issue of widening regional disparities ==
Although the promotion of Shinkansen construction is often justified on the grounds of correcting regional disparities and stimulating local development, some experts argue that it has, in fact, accelerated the decline of rural areas.

The reasons cited include the following:

- After the opening of the Hokuriku Shinkansen (Nagano Shinkansen), Saku City in Nagano Prefecture experienced growth, whereas Komoro City, which was left off the Shinkansen route, has faced economic decline.
- Due to incomplete regional development and the "straw effect" (where economic activity is drawn toward larger cities), the Shinkansen has in some cases reinforced concentration in major urban centers rather than alleviating regional disparities. Some, however, dispute this view.
- The separation of heikō zairaisen has resulted in low-revenue routes being transferred to local governments, leading to fiscal strain and the fragmentation of local transportation networks.

== Operating speed ==
Seibi Shinkansen lines' maximum operating speed is 260 km/h. This is because the National Shinkansen Railway Development Act—the legal basis for the construction of Seibi Shinkansen—sets the design maximum speed at 260 km/h. At the time the law was enacted in 1972, this figure was chosen with enough margin to allow for future speed increases.

Subsequently, with technological advancements, operational speeds of 320 km/h and 300 km/h have been achieved on lines such as the Tōhoku Shinkansen (Utsunomiya — Morioka section) and the Sanyō Shinkansen. However, the maximum speed on Seibi Shinkansen lines still remains at 260 km/h. This is partly because many of these sections do not have sufficient demand to justify higher speeds. In addition, increasing the design maximum speed for newly constructed sections would raise construction costs—thereby increasing the financial burden on local governments along the route—which is generally viewed unfavorably. Furthermore, as noted earlier, completed Seibi Shinkansen infrastructure is owned by JRTT and used by JR companies through track access charges. If the operational maximum speed were raised above 260 km/h, these charges likely would increase, making JR companies generally reluctant to pursue higher speeds.

However, on October 6, 2020, JR East announced plans to raise the maximum operating speed on the Tohōku Shinkansen between Morioka — Shin-Aomori from 260 km/h to 320 km/h in the future. The goal is to begin operations at the higher speed around 2027, once noise-reduction and related construction works are completed. Also, in May 2019, JR Hokkaidō requested that JRTT carry out additional works to enable a maximum operating speed of 320 km/h on the Hokkaidō Shinkansen, which the section between Shin-Hakodate-Hokuto — Sapporo is under construction, with the additional construction costs to be borne by the company itself. While the Tokyo–Sapporo market is expected to face competition from airlines, operation at 320 km/h would bring the Shinkansen travel time down to 4 hours and 30 minutes, allowing it to achieve a certain level of competitiveness. Subsequently, in its medium-term management plan announced in March 2024, JR Hokkaidō set a medium-term goal of raising the maximum speed of the Hokkaidō Shinkansen further to 360 km/h.

== See also ==
- Shinkansen
- Super Tokkyū, the concept of building narrow-gauge lines to Shinkansen standards
- Mini-shinkansen, the concept of converting narrow-gauge lines to standard gauge or dual gauge for use by Shinkansen trains
- Gauge Change Train, known as Free Gauge Train in Japan
- Kihon Keikaku Rosen, other planned Shinkansen lines on which planning has made little progress
- Chūō Shinkansen, a Shinkansen line that is not included among the so-called Seibi Shinkansen lines, but on which construction is actually underway (originally one of the Kihon Keikaku Rosen).
