= Ōnuma-Kōen Station =

Railway station in Nanae, Hokkaido, Japan

H67 Ōnuma-Kōen Station 大沼公園駅

General information
- Location: Nanae, Kameda, Hokkaido; Japan
- Coordinates: 41°58′52″N 140°40′12″E
- Operator: JR Hokkaido
- Line: Hakodate Main Line
- Platforms: 1 side platform

Construction
- Structure type: 1

Other information
- Station code: H67

History
- Opened: 5 June 1908; 118 years ago
- Former names: Ōnuma (until 1964)

Services
| Preceding station | JR Hokkaido | Following station |
|---|---|---|
| Ōnuma towards Hakodate | Hakodate Main Line Local | Akaigawa towards Asahikawa |
Limited Express
| Shin-Hakodate-Hokuto towards Hakodate | Hokuto | Mori towards Sapporo |
Location

Ōnuma-Kōen Station (大沼公園駅, Ōnuma-Kōen-eki) is a railway station on the JR Hokkaido Hakodate Main Line. It is located in Nanae, Hokkaidō, Japan.

== Station structure ==
The station has one platform with one track serving trains of both directions.

== History ==
The station first opened on June 5, 1907 as Ōnuma-Kōen temporary stop (kari-teishajō) for passengers on the existing line of Hokkaido Railway. The railway company was nationalized on July 1 the same year. The stop was closed "for the time being" on December 21, 1907.

The stop was reopened as the Ministry of Communication notified on the Official Gazette (issued May 25, 1908) that the stop would be open during the summer and fall and that the dates of opening and closing would be announced in the stations every time. JR Hokkaido claims that the station was opened on June 1, 1908.

On December 16, 1911 and January 11, 1913, it was announced that the station would be open during the winter. On November 4, 1913, it was announced that the station would be opened anytime where necessary. The freight service started from June 1, 1917. The temporary stop was renamed as Ōnuma on June 15, 1920 and promoted to a full station on November 11, 1924.

The freight service ceased on May 20, 1960. The station name was restored as Ōnuma-Kōen on May 1, 1964.
