= Ōnuma Station =

Railway station in Nanae, Hokkaido, Japan

H68 Ōnuma Station 大沼駅
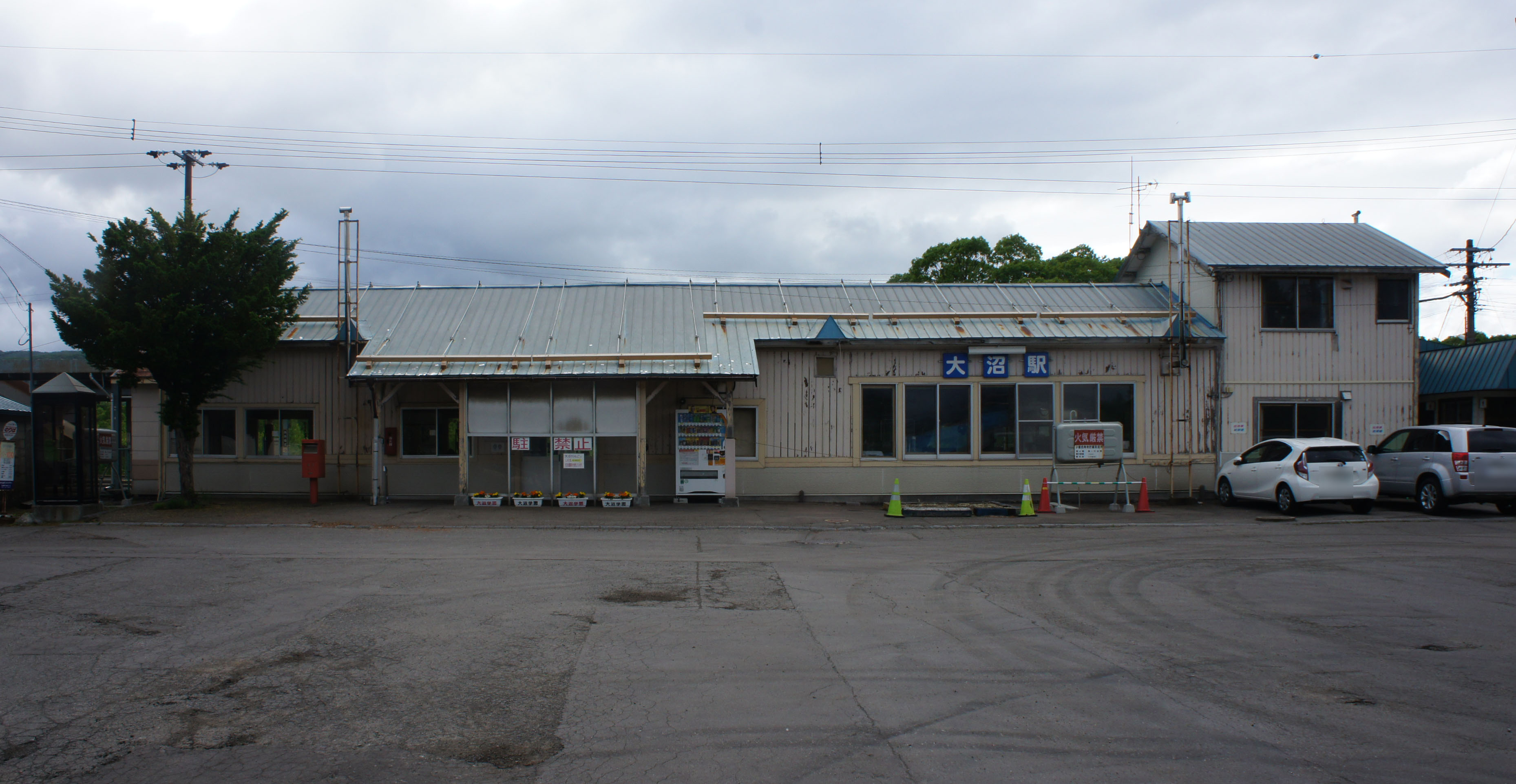
- Ōnuma Station in 2018

General information
- Location: 4-5 Ōnuma-Cho, Nanae Town, Kameda District; Hokkaido Prefecture; Japan
- Coordinates: 41°58′19″N 140°40′09″E
- Operator: JR Hokkaido
- Line: Hakodate Main Line
- Distance: 27.0 km (16.8 mi) from Hakodate
- Platforms: 2 side platforms
- Tracks: 2 + 1 through-track

Construction
- Structure type: At-grade

Other information
- Status: Unstaffed station
- Station code: H68
- Website: https://www.jrhokkaido.co.jp/

History
- Opened: 28 June 1903; 123 years ago

Passengers
- 2014-2018 (Average): 90.4 daily

Services
Preceding station	JR Hokkaido	Following station
Shin-Hakodate-Hokuto H70 towards Hakodate	Hakodate Main Line	Ōnuma-Kōen H67 towards Asahikawa
Nanae H71 Terminus	Hakodate Main Line Fujishiro branch line	Terminus
Terminus	Hakodate Main Line Sawara branch line	Shikabe N68 towards Mori
Location
- Location within Hokkaido Location within Japan

Ōnuma Station (大沼駅, Ōnuma-eki) is a railway station on the Hakodate Main Line located in Nanae, Hokkaidō, Japan. It is operated by JR Hokkaido and has the station number "H68".

== Lines ==
The station is served by the Hakodate Main Line and is located 27.0 km from the start of the line at Hakodate.

== Station layout ==
The station has two platforms serving three tracks on the ground level.

=== Platforms ===
1	■Hakodate Main Line	For Hakodate
2	■	(siding)
3	■Hakodate Main Line	For Ōnuma-Kōen and Mori (via Komagatame); For Shikabe and Mori (via Oshima-Sawara)

== History ==
The station was opened on 28 June 1903 by the private Hokkaido Railway as an intermediate station during the phase of expansion when the track was extended north from Hongō (today Shin-Hakodate-Hokuto) to Mori. After the Hokkaido Railway was nationalized on 1 July 1907, Japanese Government Railways (JGR) took over control of the station. On 12 October 1909 the station became part of the Hakodate Main Line. On 1 April 1987, with the privatization of Japanese National Railways (JNR), the successor of JGR, control of the station passed to JR Hokkaido.

== See also ==
- List of railway stations in Japan
