= Hakodate Liner =

Japanese train service

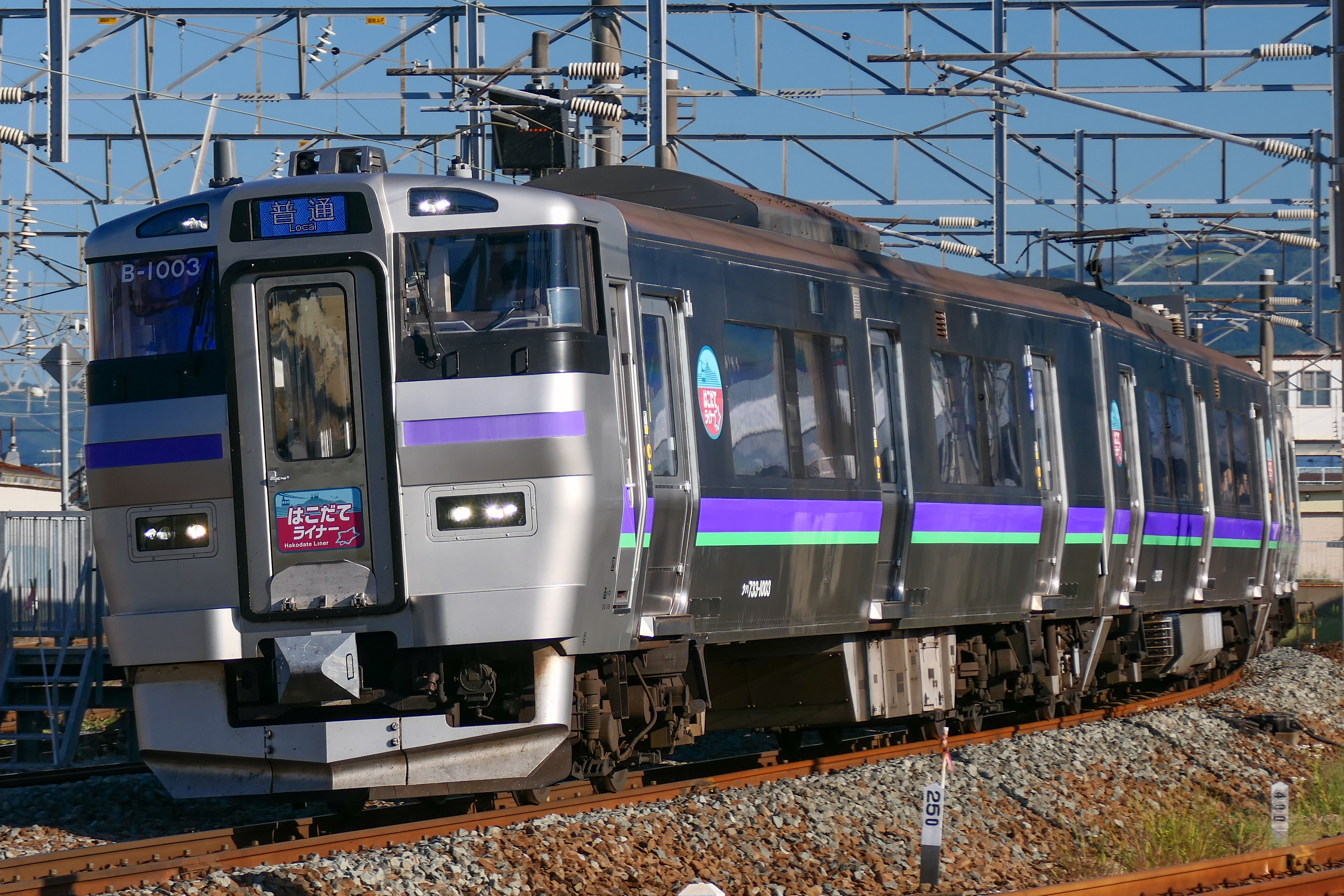

Overview
- Status: Operational
- First service: 26 March 2016
- Current operator: JR Hokkaido

Route
- Termini: Hakodate; Shin-Hakodate-Hokuto
- Stops: 3
- Distance travelled: 17.9 km (11.1 mi)
- Line used: Hakodate Main Line

Technical
- Rolling stock: 733-1000 series

The Hakodate Liner (Japanese: はこだてライナー) is a rapid train service operated by Hokkaido Railway Company (JR Hokkaido). It runs between Hakodate and Shin-Hakodate-Hokuto stations on the Hakodate Main Line.

The Hakodate Liner debuted on 26 March 2016, coinciding with the Hokkaido Shinkansen's opening, with the main purpose for Hokkaido Shinkansen riders to get to Hakodate or Goryokaku quickly, or for people in Hakodate or Goryokaku to get to Shin-Hakodate-Hokuto quickly to transfer to the Hokkaido Shinkansen.

== Service pattern ==
The Hakodate Liner travels a distance of 17.9 kilometres (11.1 mi) between Hakodate and Shin-Hakodate-Hokuto on the Hakodate Main Line. The journey takes approximately 15 minutes.

== Stations ==
The Hakodate Liner stops at the following stations:

Stop List
| Station | Transfer |
|---|---|
| H75 Hakodate | |
| H74 Goryōkaku | |
| H70 Shin-Hakodate-Hokuto | Hokkaido Shinkansen |

== Rolling stock ==
The Hakodate Liner is operated using 733-1000 series three-car electric multiple units (EMUs), the first of which were delivered in October 2015. The trains can be coupled to form six-car sets during peak hours.
