= Mori Station (Hokkaido) =

Railway station in Mori, Hokkaido, Japan

Coordinates: 42°06′32″N 140°34′26″E

H62 Mori Station 森駅
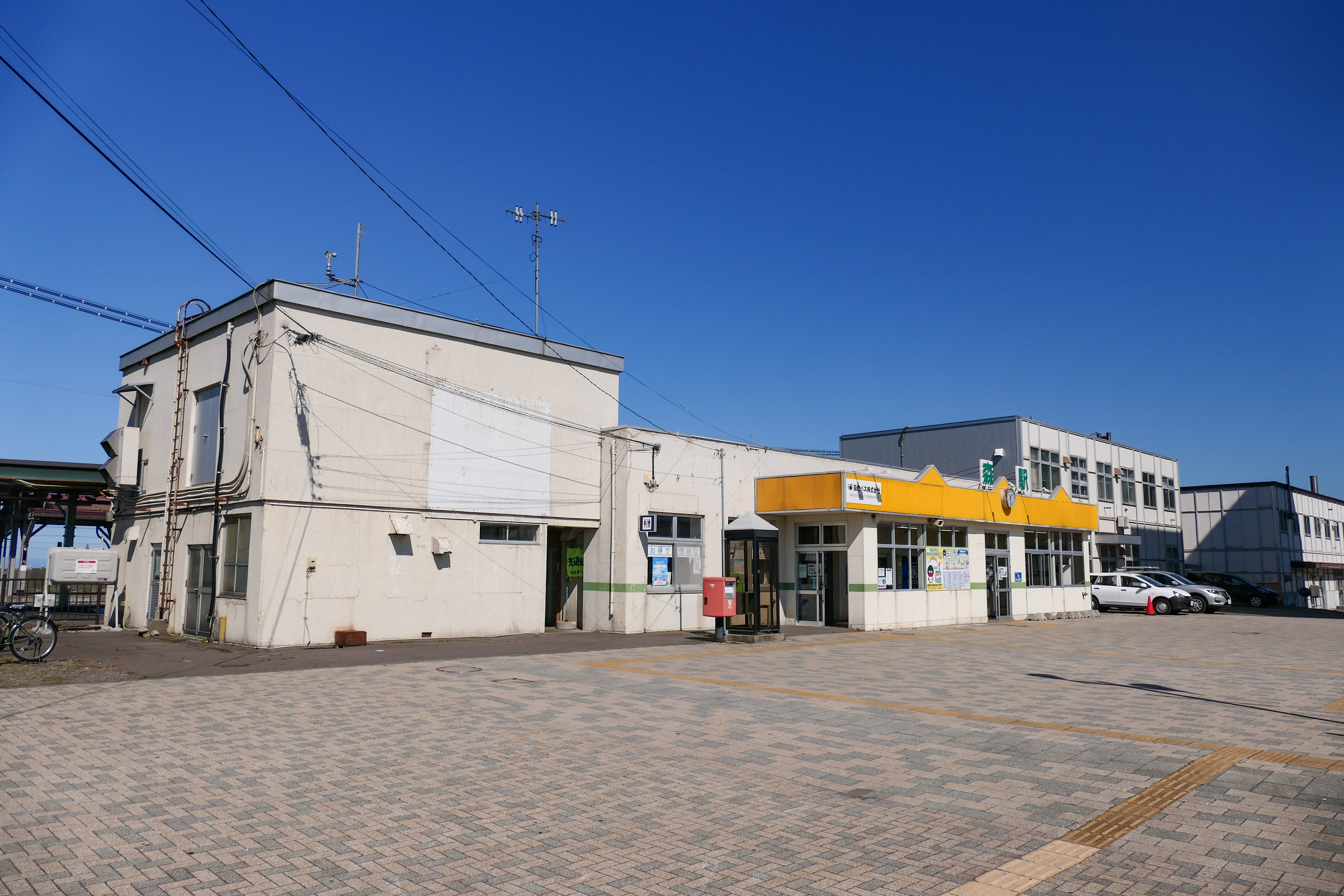
- Mori Station in September 2022

General information
- Location: Honcho, Mori-machi, Kayabe-gun, Hokkaido 049-2325; Japan
- Operator: JR Hokkaido
- Line: ■ Hakodate Main Line
- Platforms: 1 island + 1 side platform
- Tracks: 3

Construction
- Structure type: At grade

Other information
- Status: Staffed (Midori no Madoguchi)
- Station code: H62
- Website: Official website

History
- Opened: 28 June 1903; 123 years ago

Passengers
- 2019: 277 daily

Services
Preceding station	JR Hokkaido	Following station
Ōnuma-Kōen H67 towards Hakodate	Hokuto	Yakumo H54 towards Sapporo
Komagatake H65 towards Hakodate	Hakodate Main Line Local	Ishikura H58 towards Asahikawa
Higashi-Mori N63 towards Hakodate	Hakodate Main Line Sawara branch	Ishikura H58 towards Asahikawa
Location
- Location within Hokkaido Location within Japan

Mori Station (森駅, Mori-eki) is a railway station on the Hakodate Main Line in Mori, Hokkaido, Japan, operated by the Hokkaido Railway Company (JR Hokkaido).

== Lines ==
Mori Station is served by the Hakodate Main Line. Limited express Hokuto services operating between Sapporo and Hakodate stop here.

== Station layout ==
The station has one island platform and one side platform serving a total of three tracks.

=== Platforms ===
1	■ Hakodate Main Line	for Oshamanbe and Sapporo
2	■ Hakodate Main Line	(Not normally used)
3	■ Hakodate Main Line	for Ōnuma-Kōen and Hakodate (via Komagatame) for Shikabe and Hakodate (via Oshima-Sawara)

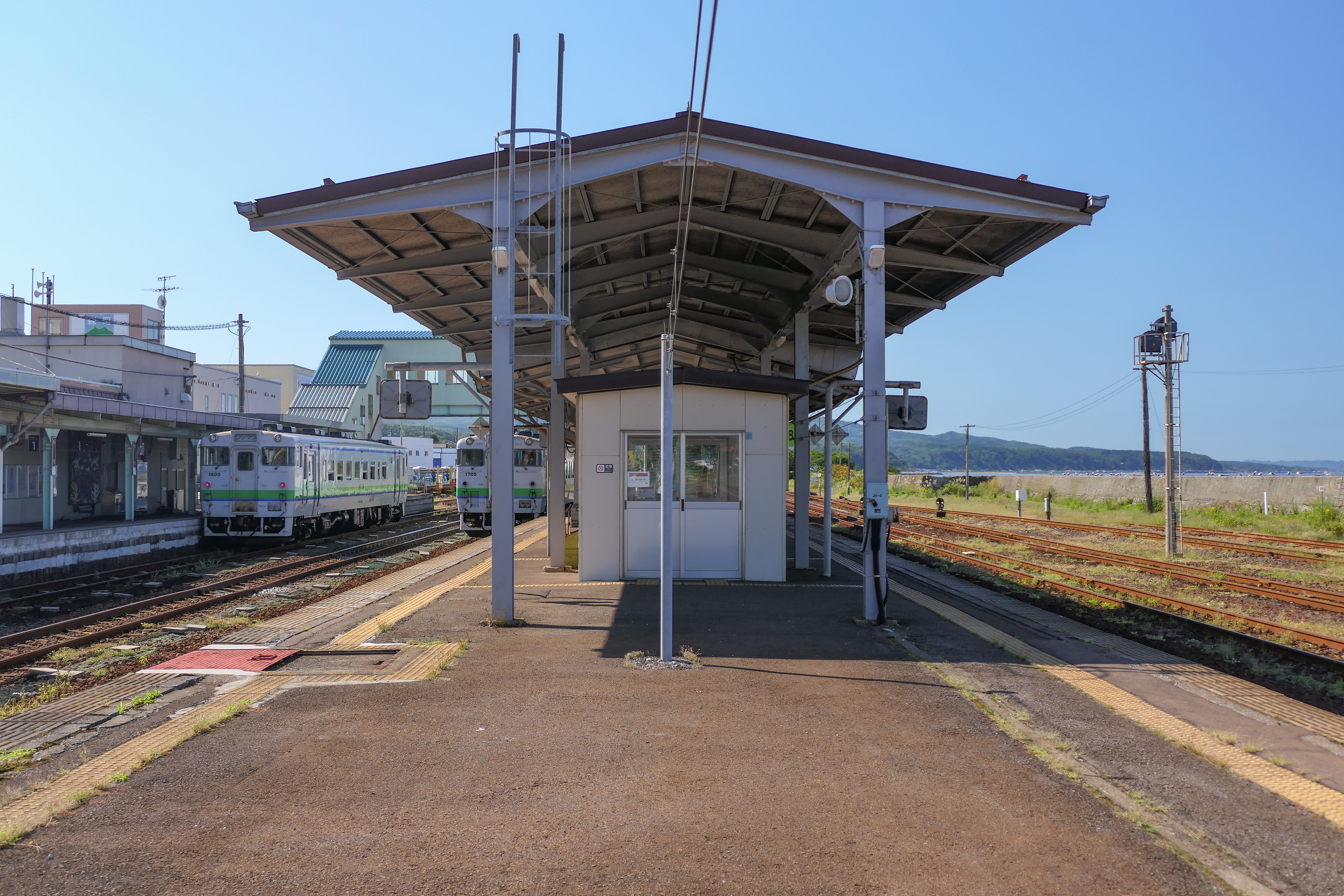
The platforms in September 2022

== History ==
The station opened on 28 June 1903. With the privatization of Japanese National Railways (JNR) on 1 April 1987, the station came under the control of JR Hokkaido.

== Surrounding area ==
- National Route 5
- Uniushi Park

== See also ==
- List of railway stations in Japan
- Ikameshi
