= Shikabe Station =

Railway station in Shikabe, Hokkaido, Japan

Coordinates: 42.0639°N 140.7711°E

Shikabe Station 鹿部駅
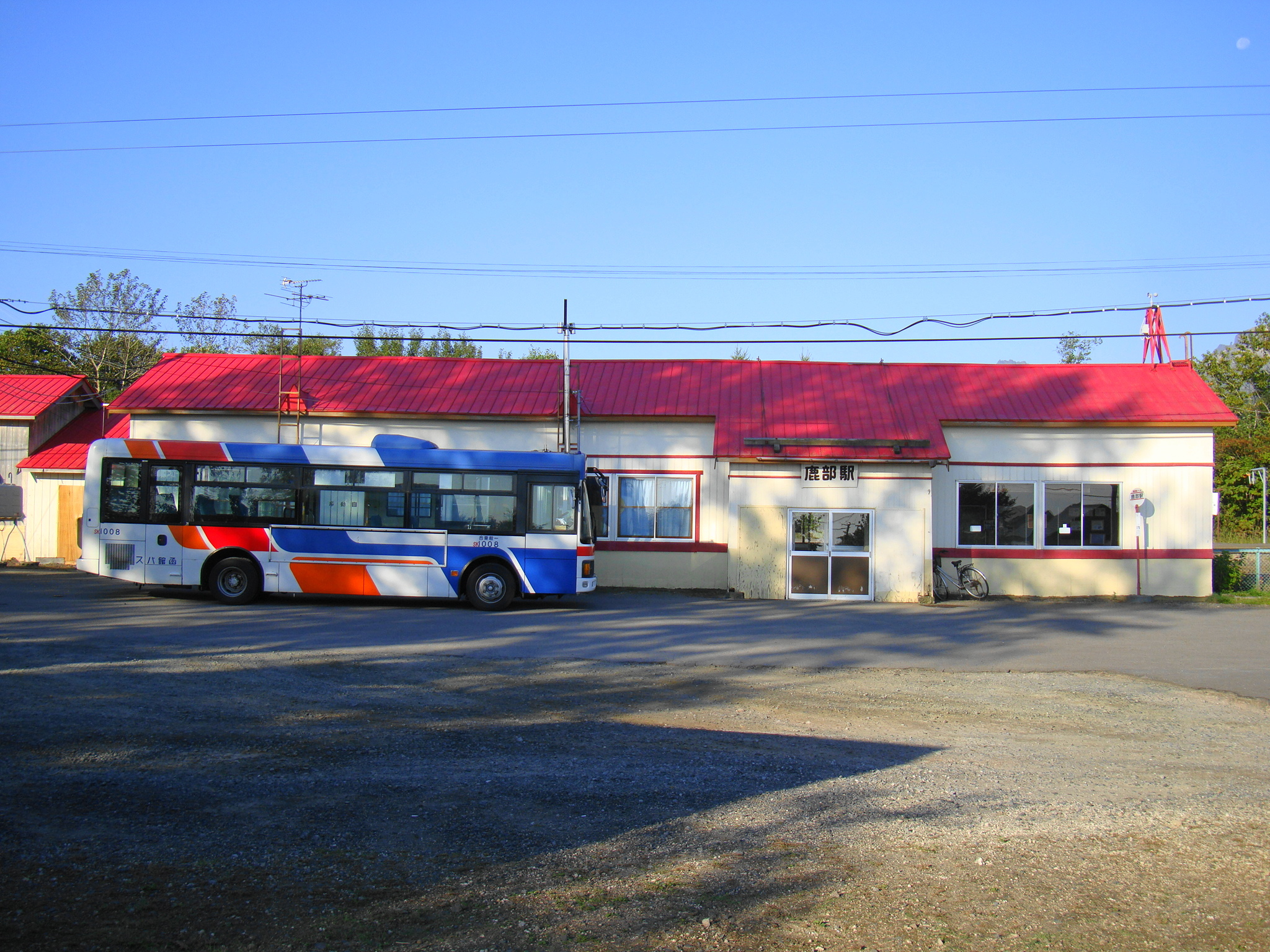
- Station building

General information
- Location: Shikabe, Kayabe District, Hokkaidō, Japan
- Line: Hakodate Main Line
Location

Shikabe Station (鹿部駅, Shikabe-eki) is a railway station in Shikabe, Kayabe District, Hokkaidō, Japan.

== Lines ==
- Hokkaido Railway Company
  - Hakodate Main Line (Sawara branch line) Station N68

== Adjacent stations ==
| « | Service | » |
Hakodate Main Line (Sawara branch line)
| Onuma | - | Oshima-Numajiri |
