= Hakodate Station =

Railway station in Hakodate, Hokkaido, Japan

Coordinates: 41.773736°N 140.726398°E

H75 Hakodate Station 函館駅
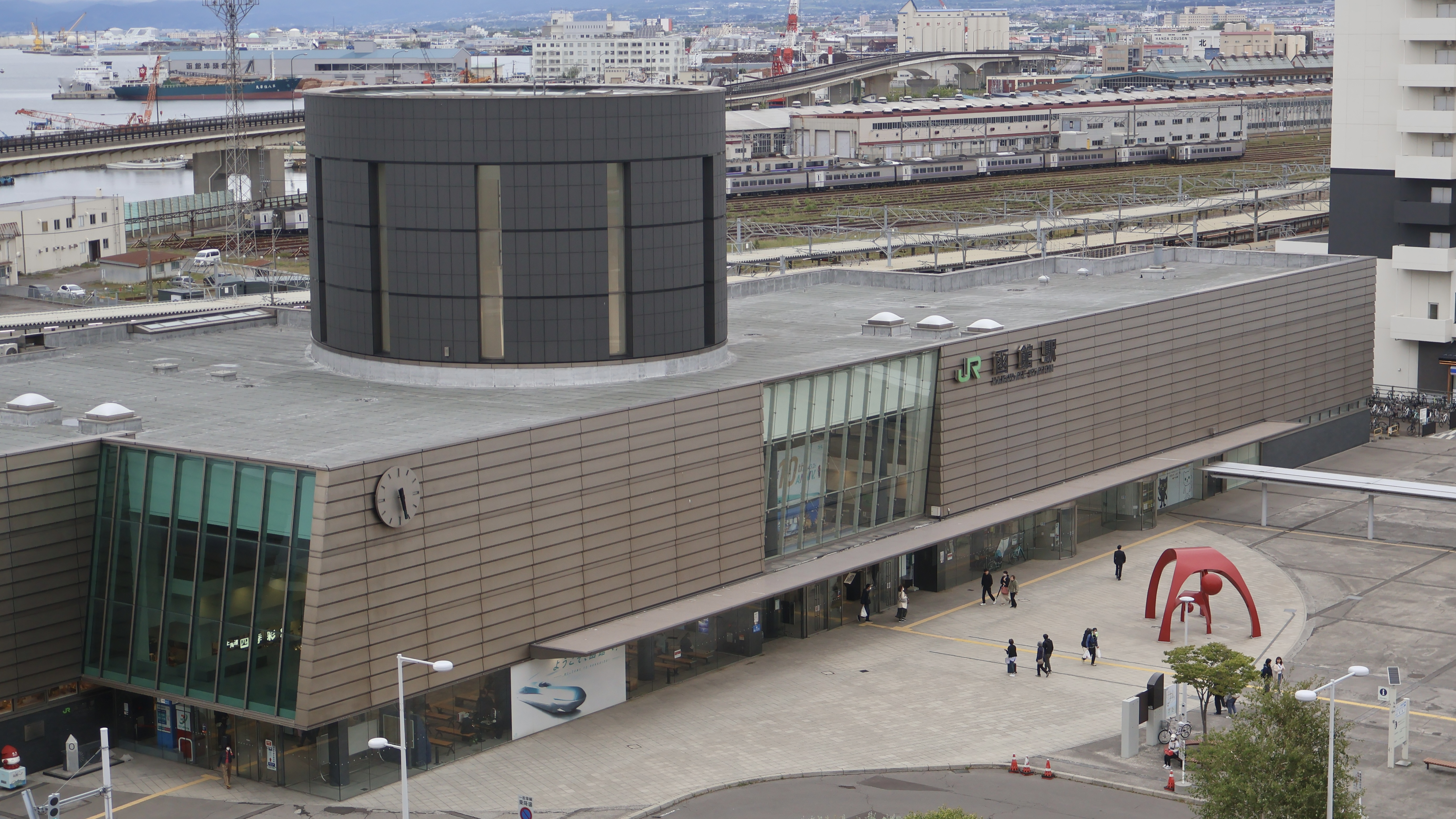
- Exterior of the station in 2026

General information
- Location: Hakodate, Hokkaido; Japan
- Operator: JR Hokkaido
- Line: Hakodate Main Line
- Platforms: 4 island platforms
- Tracks: 8

Construction
- Structure type: At-grade

Other information
- Station code: H75

History
- Opened: 10 December 1902; 123 years ago

Services
Preceding station	JR Hokkaido	Following station
Terminus	Hokuto	Goryōkaku towards Sapporo
Terminus	Hakodate Main Line Rapid Hakodate Liner	Goryōkaku towards Shin-Hakodate-Hokuto
Terminus	Hakodate Main Line Local	Goryōkaku towards Asahikawa
Preceding station	South Hokkaido Railway Company	Following station
Terminus	South Hokkaido Railway Line	Goryōkaku towards Kikonai
Location
- Location within Hokkaido Location within Japan

Hakodate Station (Japanese: 函館駅, Hepburn: Hakodate-eki) is a railway station on the Hakodate Main Line in Hakodate, Hokkaido, Japan, operated by the Hokkaido Railway Company (JR Hokkaido).

== Lines ==
- South Hokkaido Railway Company's Dōnan Isaribi Tetsudō Line (nominally ends at Goryōkaku, but trains generally serve Hakodate as well)
- Hakodate Main Line
- Tsugaru-Kaikyō Line (formerly)

Hakodate Station is the terminus of the Hakodate Main Line and the former Tsugaru-Kaikyō Line; Hakodate Municipal Transit streetcars stop at the adjacent Hakodate Ekimae Station.

== Train services ==
In addition to local services, the following long-distance trains serve Hakodate Station.

- Hokuto limited express to Sapporo

The following services ended in March 2016 due to the Hokkaido Shinkansen's opening: From Shin-Hakodate-Hokuto Station to Shin-Aomori Station, which takes a similar route of the Hakuchō\Super Hakuchō. All services go through to Tokyo station, which means the two former sleeper trains had to be discontinued due to the Hokkaido Shinkansen's opening. An extension to Sapporo is currently under construction and will be completed in fiscal 2031.

- Hakuchō and Super Hakuchō limited express to Shin-Aomori
- Cassiopeia and Hokutosei sleeping car limited express to Sapporo and Ueno
- Hamanasu sleeping car express to Sapporo and Aomori

== Station layout ==
The station has four platforms serving eight terminating tracks.

1-4	■Hakodate Main Line	Local services for Nanae, Ōnuma, Mori and Oshamanbe
1-4	■South Hokkaido Railway Line	Local services for Kamiiso and Kikonai
5-8	■Hokuto limited express	For Oshamanbe, Higashi-Muroran and Sapporo
5-8	Hakodate Liner	For Shin-Hakodate Hokuto
5-8	■Hakucho limited express	For Shin-Aomori (discontinued)
5-8	■Hokutosei limited express	For Sendai and Ueno (discontinued)

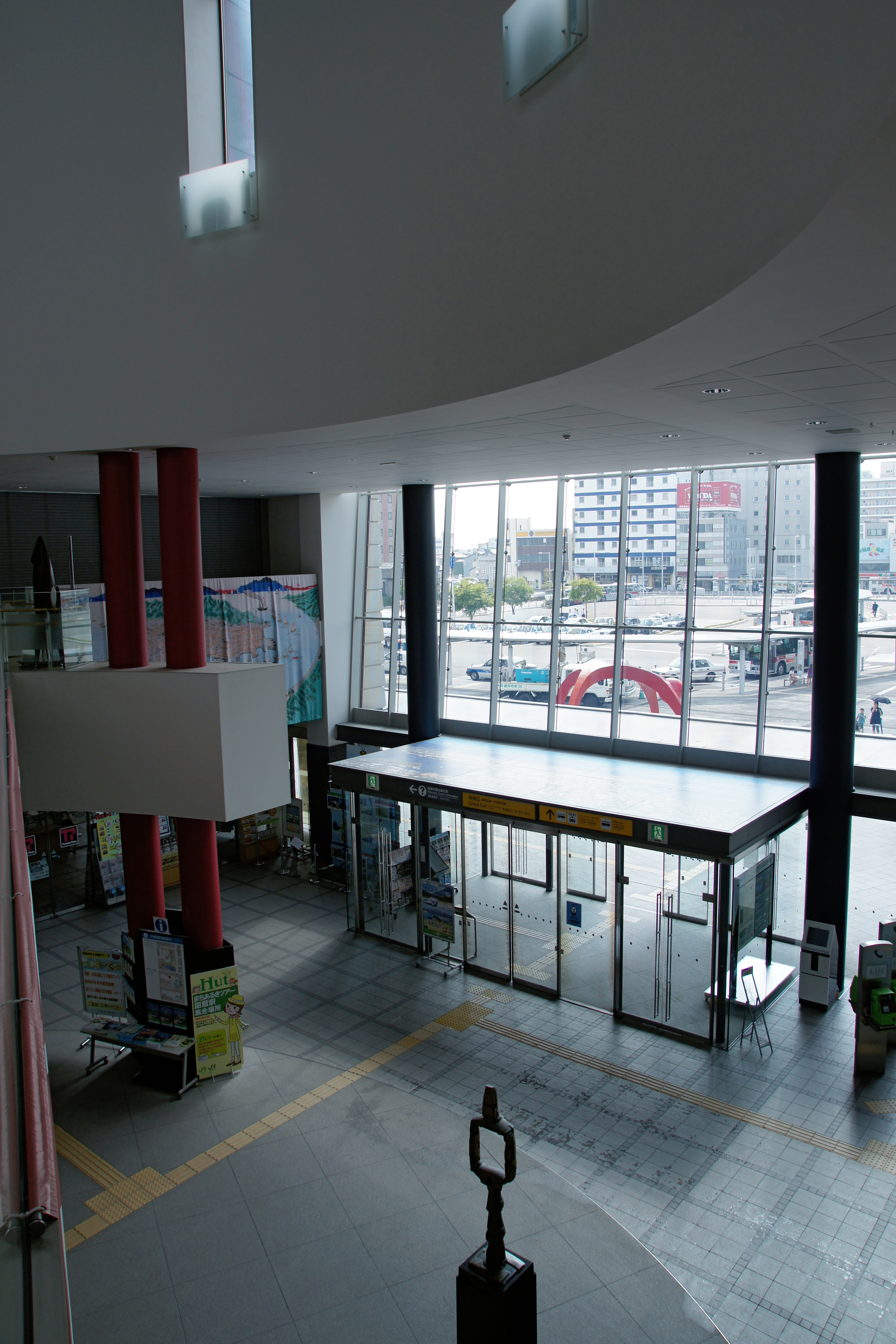
The main entrance

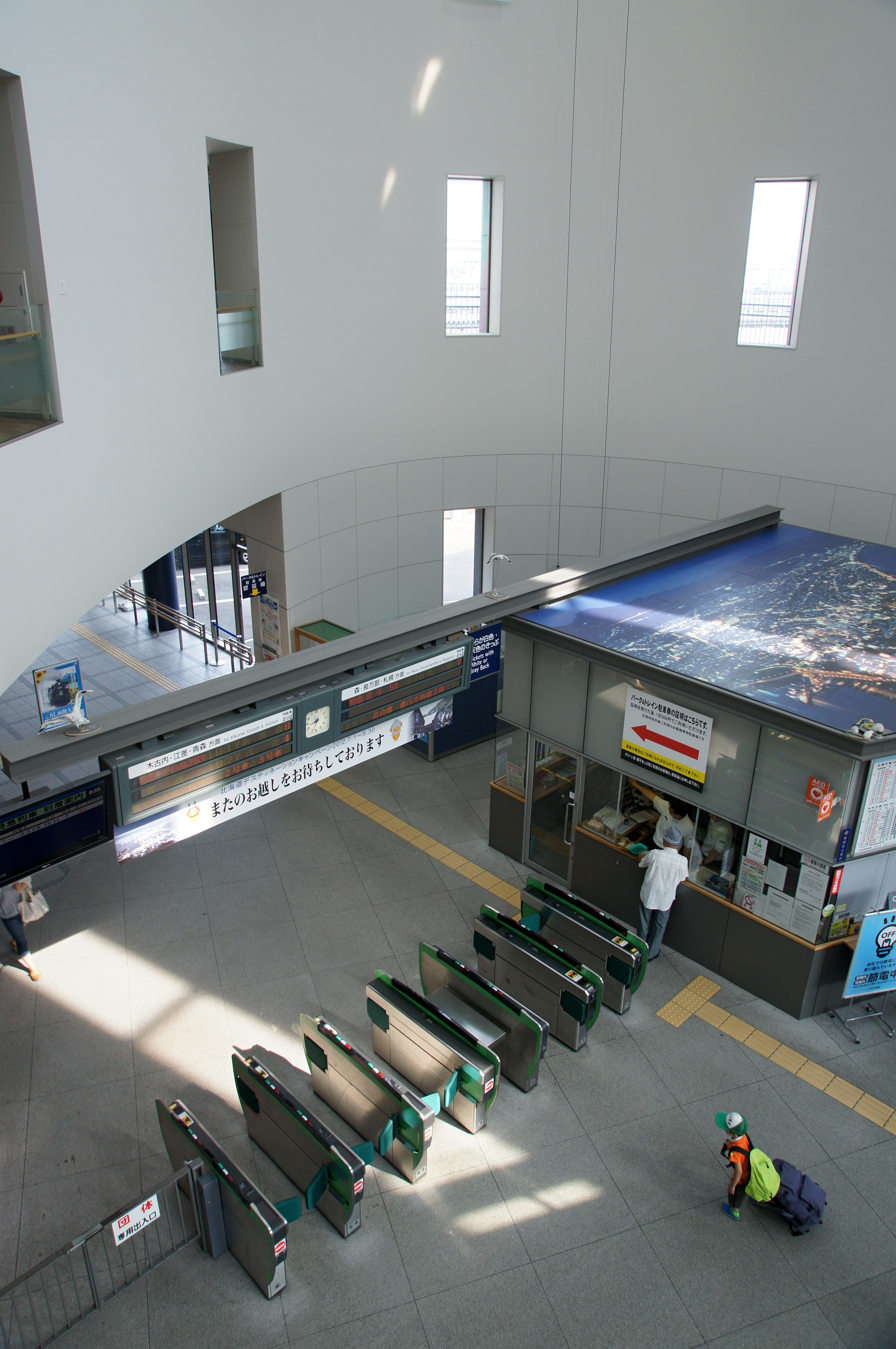
Ticket gates

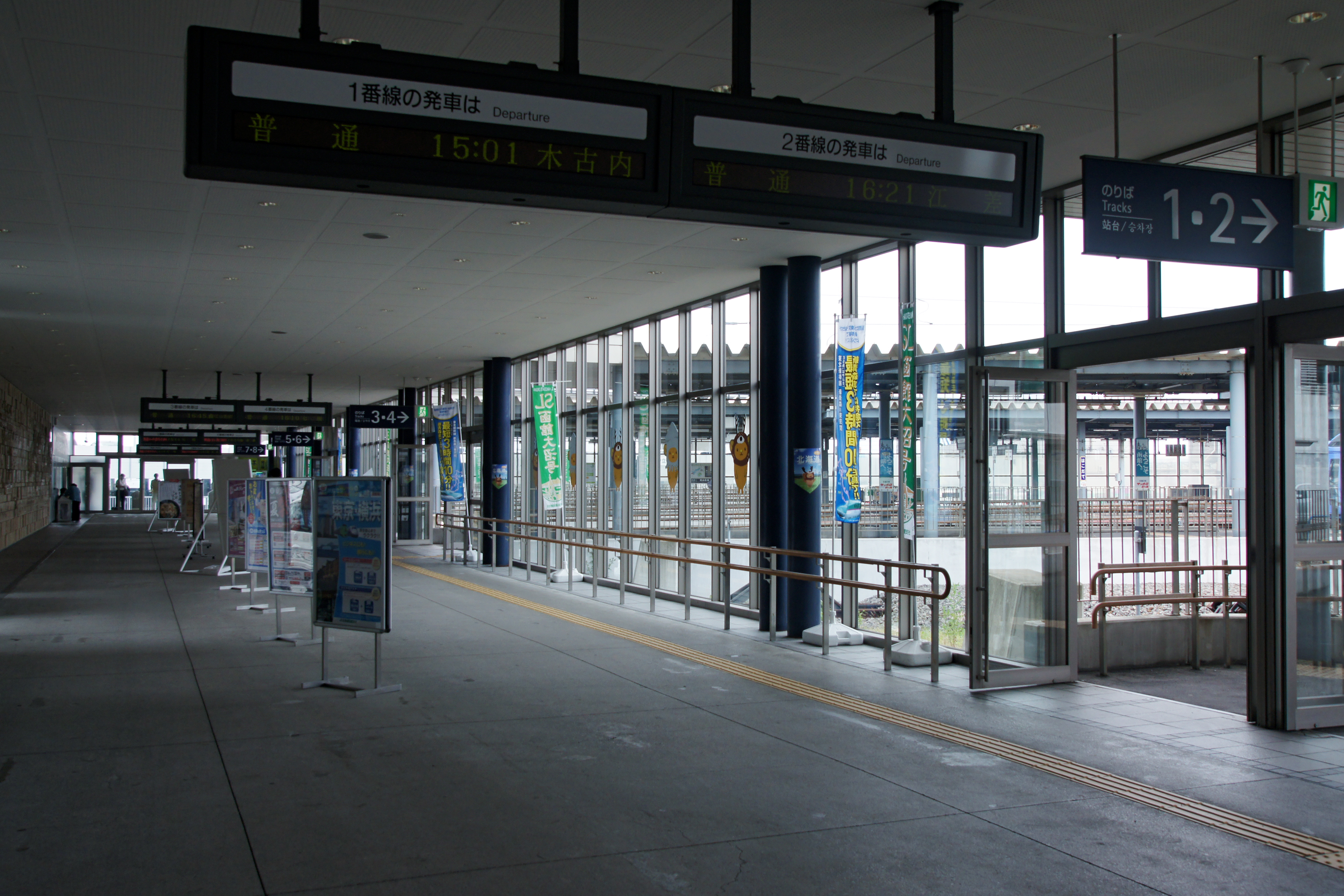
Passageway to tracks

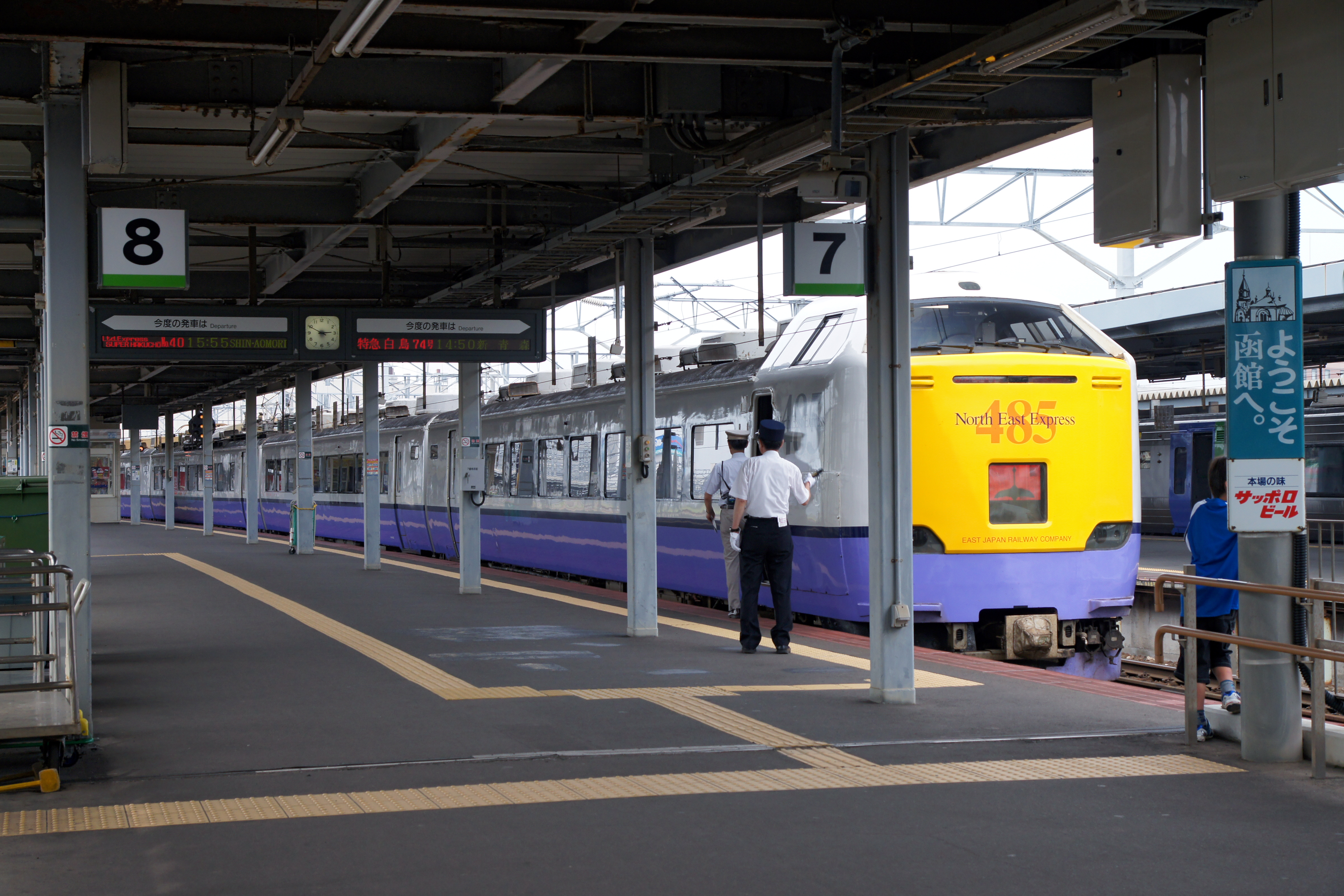
Platforms

== History ==
Hakodate station first opened on 10 December 1902.

The current station building was opened on 21 June 2003.

Shinkansen services stop at Shin-Hakodate-Hokuto Station, approximately 18 km away from Hakodate Station since 26 March 2016, the day the Shinkansen station opened. "Relay" shuttle services (Hakodate liner) using three-car 733 series electric trains operate between Hakodate and Shin-Hakodate-Hokuto Station.
