= List of Natural Monuments of Japan (Hokkaido) =

This list is of the Natural Monuments of Japan within the circuit of Hokkaidō.

== National Natural Monuments ==
As of 1 October 2016, forty-seven Natural Monuments have been designated, including six *Special Natural Monuments.

| Monument | Municipality | Comments | Image | Coordinates | Type | Ref. |
|---|---|---|---|---|---|---|
| *Mount Apoi alpine plant communities アポイ岳高山植物群落; Apoi-dake kōzan shokubutsu gunraku | Samani | | | 42°06′50″N 143°01′55″E | 1.3 | |
| *Marimo of Lake Akan; Aegagropila linnaei 阿寒湖のマリモ; Akan-ko no marimo | Akan | | | 43°27′12″N 144°06′08″E | 2.8, 12 | |
| *Shōwa-shinzan 昭和新山; Shōwa-shinzan | Sōbetsu | | | 42°32′33″N 140°51′52″E | 3.10 | |
| *Daisetsuzan 大雪山; Daisetsuzan | Kamikawa, Higashikawa, Biei, Shintoku | | | 43°33′04″N 142°49′48″E | 4 | |
| *Nopporo Forest Park 野幌原始林; Nopporo genshi-rin | Kitahiroshima | | | 42°59′28″N 141°32′01″E | 2.2 | |
| *Japanese crane Grus japonensis タンチョウ; Tanchō | | | | | 1.2 | |
| Hokkaido; Canis lupus familiaris 北海道犬; Hokkaidō-ken | | | | | 1.4 | |
| Golden eagle Aquila chrysaetos イヌワシ; Inu-washi | | | | | 1.2 | |
| White-tailed eagle Haliaeetus albicilla オジロワシ; Ojiro-washi | | | | | 1.2 | |
| Steller's sea eagle Haliaeetus pelagicus オオワシ; Ō-washi | | | | | 1.2 | |
| Blakiston's fish owl Bubo blakistoni blakistoni エゾシマフクロウ; Ezo-shimafukurō | | | | | 1.1 | |
| Brent goose Branta bernicla コクガン; Kokugan | | | | | 1.2 | |
| Greater white-fronted goose Anser albifrons マガン; Magan | | | | | 1.2 | |
| Bean goose Anser fabalis ヒシクイ; Hishikui | | | | | 1.2 | |
| Black woodpecker Dryocopus martius クマゲラ; Kumagera | | | | | 1.2 | |
| Eversmann's parnassian Parnassius eversmanni ウスバキチョウ; Usubaki-chō | | | | | 1.2 | |
| Melissa Arctic; Oeneis melissa daizetsuzana ダイセツタカネヒカゲ; Daisetsu-takanehikage | | | | | 1.2 | |
| Freija fritillary Clossiana freija アサヒヒョウモン; Asahi-hyōmon | | | | | 1.2 | |
| Grizzled skipper Pyrgus malvae ヒメチャマダラセセリ; Hime-chamadara-seseri | | | | | 1.2 | |
| Sakhalin holly blue Celastrina sachalinensis カラフトルリシジミ; Karafuto-rurishijimi | | | | | 1.2 | |
| Yezosaurus fossil Taniwhasaurus mikasaensis エゾミカサリュウ化石; Ezo Mikasa Ryū kaseki | Mikasa | kept at Mikasa City Museum | | 43°15′41″N 141°57′46″E | 3.12 | |
| Breeding grounds of the streaked shearwater Calonectris leucomelas オオミズナギドリ繁殖地; Ōmizunagidori hanshokuchi | Matsumae | on Ōshima | | 41°30′42″N 139°21′26″E | 1.2 | |
| Onnetō Hot Falls manganese oxide generation area オンネトー湯の滝マンガン酸化物生成地; Onnetō yu-no-taki mangan sankabutsu seiseichi | Ashoro | | | 43°22′13″N 143°58′39″E | 2.8; 3.1, 8 | |
| Thujopsis and Sakhalin fir habitat Thujopsis dolabrata var. hondae Abies sachalinensis var. mayriana ヒノキアスナロおよびアオトドマツ自生地; Hinoki-asunaro oyobi ao-todomatsu jiseichi | Esashi | | | 41°49′11″N 140°12′31″E | 2.2, 10 | |
| Maruyama primeval forest 円山原始林; Maruyama genshi-rin | Sapporo | | | 43°02′54″N 141°18′50″E | 2.2 | |
| Utasai northernmost limit of the Japanese beech Fagus crenata 歌才ブナ自生北限地帯; Utasai buna jisei hokugen chitai | Kuromatsunai | | | 42°38′46″N 140°19′48″E | 2.10 | |
| Kushiro-shitsugen 釧路湿原; Kushiro-shitsugen | Shibecha, Tsurui, Kushiro | see Kushiro-shitsugen National Park, List of Ramsar sites in Japan | | 43°07′45″N 144°25′20″E | 4 | |
| Mount Shiribeshi alpine plant zone 後方羊蹄山の高山植物帯; Shiribeshi-yama no kōzan shokubutsu tai | Kutchan, Kyōgoku, Kimobetsu, Makkari, Niseko | | | 42°49′49″N 140°47′37″E | 2.3 | |
| Nemuro Kuruma-ishi 根室車石; Nemuro Kuruma-ishi | Nemuro | | | 43°16′41″N 145°35′20″E | 3.7 | |
| Primeval forest by the headwaters of the Saru River 沙流川源流原始林; Sarugawa-genryū genshi-rin | Hidaka | | | 42°58′58″N 142°44′45″E | 4 | |
| Lake Harutori common goldfish habitat Carassius auratus 春採湖ヒブナ生息地; Harutori-ko hibuna seisokuchi | Kushiro | | | 42°58′20″N 144°24′13″E | 1.3 | |
| Memanbetsu wetland plant communities 女満別湿生植物群落; Memanbetsu shitsusei shokubutsu gunraku | Ōzora | | | 43°56′05″N 144°10′48″E | 2.2 | |
| Kojima, Matsumae 松前小島; Matsumae Kojima | Matsumae | | | 41°21′35″N 139°48′20″E | 4 | |
| Natural forests of Yagishiri 焼尻の自然林; Yagishiri no shinzen-rin | Haboro | | | 44°26′21″N 141°25′12″E | 2.2 | |
| Moiwa primeval forest 藻岩原始林; Moiwa genshi-rin | Sapporo | | | 43°01′36″N 141°19′33″E | 2.2 | |
| Daikoku Island seabird breeding grounds 大黒島海鳥繁殖地; Daikoku-jima kaichō hanshokuchi | Akkeshi | | | 42°57′01″N 144°52′09″E | 1.2 | |
| Teuri Island seabird breeding grounds 天売島海鳥繁殖地; Teuri-tō kaichō hanshokuchi | Haboro | | | 44°25′09″N 141°17′41″E | 1.2 | |
| Noboribetsu primeval forest 登別原始林; Noboribetsu genshi-rin | Noboribetsu | | | 42°29′45″N 141°09′15″E | 2.2 | |
| Shibetsu Marsh 標津湿原; Shibetsu-shitsugen | Shibetsu | | | 43°40′34″N 145°06′36″E | 4 | |
| Horoman Japanese white pine habitat Pinus parviflora 幌満ゴヨウマツ自生地; Horoman goyōmatsu jiseichi | Samani | | | 42°06′00″N 143°03′32″E | 2.2 | |
| Kiritappu peat-forming plant communities 霧多布泥炭形成植物群落; Kiritappu deitan keisei shokubutsu gunraku | Hamanaka | | | 43°05′38″N 145°04′48″E | 2.6 | |
| Nayoro loess dolls 名寄高師小僧; Nayoro takashi kozō | Nayoro | | | 44°22′05″N 142°22′50″E | 3.1, 4 | |
| Nayoro bell stone 名寄鈴石; Nayoro suzu-ishi | Nayoro | | | 44°19′45″N 142°28′42″E | 3.1, 7 | |
| Mount Yūbari alpine plant communities and serpentinite mélange zone 夕張岳の高山植物群落および蛇紋岩メランジュ帯; Yūbari-dake no kōzan shokubutsu gunraku oyobi jamon-gan meranju-tai | Yūbari | | | 43°06′11″N 142°14′12″E | 2.2, 3 | |
| Cape Ochiishi Sakai rhododendron habitat Rhododendron parvifolium 落石岬のサカイツツジ自生地; Ochiishi-misaki no sakai-tsutsuji jiseichi | Nemuro | | | 43°09′54″N 145°30′23″E | 2.10 | |
| Wakoto Minminzemi zone Hyalessa maculaticollis 和琴ミンミンゼミ発生地; Wakoto minminzemi hassei-chi | Teshikaga | | | 43°35′02″N 144°18′47″E | 1.2 | |
| River Uzura northernmost native limit of the Japanese white pine Pinus parviflora 鶉川ゴヨウマツ自生北限地帯; Uzura-gawa goyōmatsu jisei hokugen chitai | Assabu | | | 41°59′25″N 140°25′34″E | 2.10 | |

Completed

== Prefectural Natural Monuments ==
As of 21 September 2016, thirty-three Natural Monuments have been designated at a prefectural level.

| Monument | Municipality | Comments | Image | Coordinates | Type | Ref. |
|---|---|---|---|---|---|---|
| Kayabe Chestnut Forest; Castanea crenata 茅部の栗林; Kayabe no kuri-bayashi | Mori | | | 42°06′13″N 140°34′35″E | | |
| Calcareous sinter of Futamata Onsen 二股温泉の石灰華; Futamata Onsen no sekkaika | Oshamambe | | | 42°34′36″N 140°14′22″E | | |
| Andesite columnar jointing of Cape Shibi, Otobe 乙部鮪ノ岬の安山岩柱状節理; Otobe Shibi-no-misaki no anzangan chūjō setsuri | Otobe | | | 42°02′12″N 140°04′58″E | | |
| Japanese yew of Kogane; Taxus cuspidata 黄金水松; Kogane mizumatsu | Ashibetsu | | | 43°35′25″N 142°13′14″E | | |
| Potholes of Sorachi Ōtaki 空知大滝甌穴群; Sorachi ōtaki ōketsugun | Ashibetsu | | | 43°26′24″N 142°16′58″E | | |
| Uryū-numa high moor belt 雨竜沼高層湿原帯; Uryū-numa kōsō shitsugen-tai | Uryū | see Shokanbetsu-Teuri-Yagishiri Quasi-National Park, List of Ramsar sites in Japan | | 43°41′48″N 141°36′14″E | | |
| Fossil type specimen of the Takikawa sea cow タキカワカイギュウ化石標本; Takikawa-kaigyū kaseki hyōhon | Takikawa | kept at the Takikawa Museum of Art and Natural History | | 43°33′07″N 141°54′53″E | | |
| Large outcrop of coal at Yūbari 夕張の石炭大露頭; Yūbari no sekitan dai-rotō | Yūbari | see Yūbari Coal Mine Museum | | 43°04′06″N 141°59′22″E | | |
| Tōma Limestone Cave 当麻鍾乳洞; Tōma shōnyūdō | Tōma | discovered in 1957; five main chambers stretch a total length of 135 metres | | 43°49′33″N 142°36′35″E | | |
| Nakatonbetsu Limestone Cave 中頓別鍾乳洞; Nakatonbetsu shōnyūdō | Nakatonbetsu | discovered in 1933 | | 44°59′17″N 142°20′09″E | | |
| Wakasakanai coastal dune forest 稚咲内海岸砂丘林; Wakasakanai kaigan sakyū-rin | Toyotomi | a twenty kilometre stretch of forest bordering the Sarobetsu plain and some one hundred lakes; tree species include the Yezo spruce, Japanese emperor oak, Mongolian oak, painted maple, prickly castor oil tree, and Japanese lime; the Siberian rubythroat, yellow-breasted bunting, Japanese snipe, smew, Japanese robin, and willow tit may be found within the Wildlife Protection Area | | 45°05′17″N 141°38′31″E | | |
| Rishiri Island Kurile cherry habitat Prunus nipponica var. kurilensis 利尻島のチシマザクラ自生地; Rishiri-tō no chishima-zakura jiseichi | Rishiri | | | 45°07′35″N 141°15′02″E | | |
| Wild plants around Momo-iwa, Rebun Island 礼文島桃岩付近一帯の野生植物; Rebun-tō Momo-iwa fukin ittai no yasei shokubutsu | Rebun | | | 45°17′46″N 141°01′54″E | | |
| Natural habitat of the Rebun lady's slipper orchid Cypripedium macranthum var. rebunense レブンアツモリソウ群生地; Rebun atsumorisō-gun seichi | Rebun | | | 45°25′33″N 141°00′11″E | | |
| Rhyolitic spherulites at Shirataki 白滝の流紋岩球顆; Shirataki no ryūmongan kyūka | Engaru | | | 43°53′12″N 143°11′34″E | | |
| Grassland communities of the Shari coast 斜里海岸の草原群落; Shari-kaigan no sōgen gunraku | Shari | the grasslands stretch for 2.5 km to the west of the Shari River (斜里川) | | 43°55′02″N 144°34′04″E | | |
| Oshunkoshun dolerite columnar joints オシュンコシュン粗粒玄武岩柱状節理; Oshunkoshun soryū genbugan chūjō setsuri | Shari | | | 44°02′17″N 144°56′06″E | | |
| Glasswort communities of Tsuru-numa beside Lake Saroma; Salicornia europaea 佐呂間湖畔鶴沼のアッケシソウ群落; Saroma kohan Tsuru-numa no akkeshisō gunraku | Yūbetsu | | | 44°07′58″N 143°50′17″E | | |
| Onneyu Rhododendron dauricum communities Rhododendron dauricum 温根湯エゾムラサキツツジ群落; Onneyu Ezo murasaki-tsutsuji gunraku | Kitami | | | 43°45′35″N 143°30′57″E | | |
| Mount Tarumae lava dome 樽前山熔岩円頂丘; Tarumae-san yōgan enchōkyū | Tomakomai | | | 42°41′24″N 141°22′34″E | | |
| Niikappu mud volcano 新冠泥火山; Niikappu deikazan | Niikappu | | | 42°22′28″N 142°18′36″E | | |
| Betula ovalifolia of Sarabetsu Marsh; Betula ovalifolia 更別湿原のヤチカンバ; Sarabetsu-shitsugen no yachikanba | Sarabetsu | | | 42°35′47″N 143°13′52″E | | |
| Lake Shikaribetsu Dolly Varden trout habitat Salvelinus malma 然別湖のオショロコマ生息地; Shikaribetsu-ko no oshorokoma seisokuchi | Shikaoi, Kamishihoro | | | 43°16′31″N 143°06′56″E | | |
| Satsunai River basin willow habitat Salix arbutifolia 札内川流域化粧柳自生地; Satsunai-gawa ryūiki keshō-yanagi jiseichi | Obihiro | | | 42°35′47″N 143°13′52″E | | |
| Taishō Japanese emperor oak forest Quercus dentata 大正のカシワ林; Taishō no kashiwa-rin | Obihiro | | | 42°48′09″N 143°10′17″E | | |
| "Tokachi-bōzu" patterned ground on the Obihiro University of Agriculture and Veterinary Medicine farm Quercus dentata 帯広畜産大学農場の構造土十勝坊主; Obihiro Chikusan Daigaku nōjō no kōzōdo Tokachi-bōzu | Obihiro | | | 42°51′59″N 143°10′14″E | | |
| Ōtsu coast Toitokki beach wild plant communities 大津海岸トイトツキ浜野生植物群落; Ōtsu-kaigan Toitokki-hama yasei shokubutsu gunraku | Toyokoro | | | 42°42′11″N 143°39′49″E | | |
| Ōtsu coast Chōbushi lakeside wild plant communities 大津海岸長節湖畔野生植物群落; Ōtsu-kaigan Chōbushi kohan yasei shokubutsu gunraku | Toyokoro | | | 42°39′35″N 143°36′38″E | | |
| Akkeshi Tokotan-numa Common goldfish habitat Carassius auratus 厚岸床潭沼の緋鮒生息地; Akkeshi Tokotan-numa no hibuna seisokuchi | Akkeshi | | | 43°00′11″N 144°52′05″E | | |
| Yururi and Moyururi Island seabird breeding grounds ユルリ・モユルリ島海鳥繁殖地; Yururi・Moyururi-tō kaichō hanshokuchi | Nemuro | | | 43°13′37″N 145°36′27″E | | |
| Betula ovalifolia communities of Nishibetsu Marsh; Betula ovalifolia 西別湿原ヤチカンバ群落地; Nishibetsu-shitsugen yachikanba gunraku-chi | Betsukai | | | 43°23′36″N 145°06′45″E | | |
| Rausu luminous moss Schistostega pennata 羅臼のひかりごけ; Rausu no hikarigoke | Rausu | | | 44°01′21″N 145°11′55″E | | |
| Rausu geyser 羅臼の間歇泉; Rausu no kanketsusen | Rausu | | | 44°02′01″N 145°09′34″E | | |

Completed

== Municipal Natural Monuments ==
As of 1 May 2016, one hundred and twenty-nine Natural Monuments have been designated at a municipal level.

| Monument | Municipality | Comments | Image | Coordinates | Type | Ref. |
|---|---|---|---|---|---|---|
| Ammonite fossils Ammonoidea アンモナイト化石(4点); Anmonaito kaseki (4-ten) | Mikasa | four fossils; kept at Mikasa City Museum | | 43°15′41″N 141°57′46″E | | for all refs see |
| Ammonite fossil Ammonoidea アンモナイト化石; Anmonaito kaseki | Mikasa | kept at Mikasa City Museum | | 43°15′41″N 141°57′46″E | | |
| Mammoth molar fossil Mammuthus マンモスゾウ臼歯化石; Manmosu-zō kyūshi kaseki | Yuni | kept at Yumekukan (ゆめっく館) | | 43°00′37″N 141°46′56″E | | |
| Mammoth molar fossil Mammuthus マンモスゾウ臼歯化石; Manmosu-zō kyūshi kaseki | Yuni | kept at Yumekukan (ゆめっく館) | | 43°00′37″N 141°46′56″E | | |
| Megaloceros fossil Megaloceros オオツノシカ化石; Ōtsuno-shika kaseki | Yuni | kept at Yumekukan (ゆめっく館) | | 43°00′37″N 141°46′56″E | | |
| Bison fossil Bison バイソン(Bison.sp)の化石; Baison no kaseki | Kitahiroshima | kept at Kitahiroshima East Memorial Hall (北広島東記念館) | | 42°59′15″N 141°34′23″E | | |
| Gome Island, Otoshibe 音標のゴメ島; Otoshibe no Gome-jima | Esashi | | | 44°42′03″N 142°49′54″E | | |
| Ezo salamander habitat Hynobius retardatus エゾサンショーウオ生息地; Ezo sanshōō seisokuchi | Esashi | | | 45°01′51″N 142°30′35″E | | |
| Siberian salamander Salamandrella keyserlingii キタサンショウウオ; Kita-sanshōō | Shibecha | | | | | |

== See also ==
- Cultural Properties of Japan
- List of parks and gardens of Hokkaido
- List of Places of Scenic Beauty of Japan (Hokkaido)
- List of Natural Monuments of Japan (Okinawa)
