= Kita-Toyotsu Station =

Former railway station in Oshamambe, Hokkaido, Japan

Kita-Toyotsu Station 北豊津駅
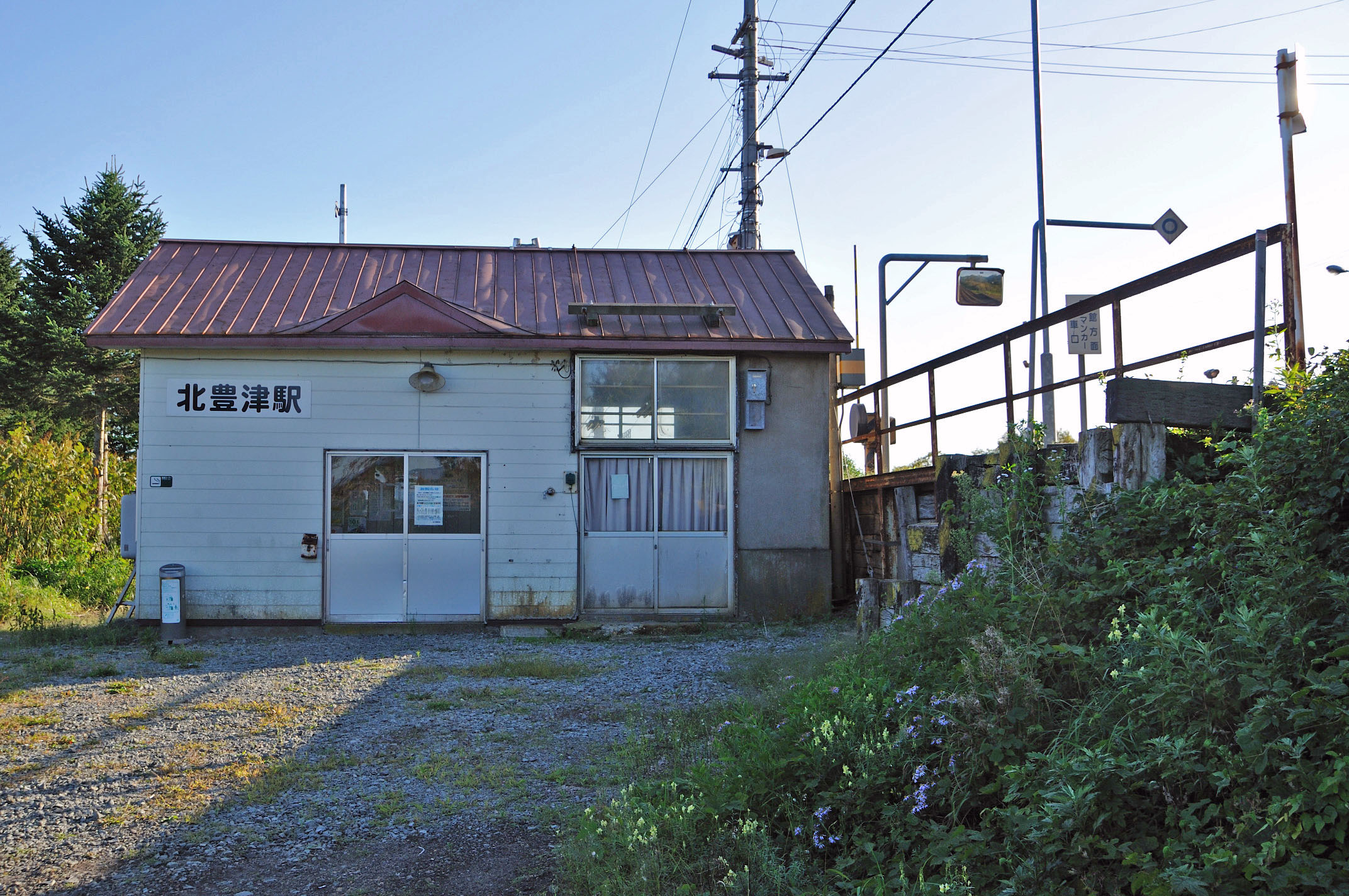
- The station building

General information
- Location: Toyotsu, Oshamambe, Yamakoshi, Hokkaido （北海道山越郡長万部町字豊津） Japan
- Coordinates: 42°24′03″N 140°17′52″E
- Operator: JR Hokkaido
- Line: Hakodate Main Line
- Connections: Bus stop

Other information
- Station code: H50

History
- Opened: 1944
- Closed: 2017
Location

Kita-Toyotsu Station (北豊津駅, Kita-Toyotsu-eki) was a railway station in Oshamambe, Yamakoshi District, Hokkaidō Prefecture, Japan.

The station closed on 4 March 2017 owing to poor patronage.

== Lines ==
- Hokkaido Railway Company
  - Hakodate Main Line Station H50

== Surrounding area ==
- National Route 5
- Hakodate Bus "Kita-Toyotsu Shingo-sho Mae" Bus Stop
