= H53 =

H53 may refer to:

- HMS Dainty (H53), a Royal Navy D-class destroyer
- Sikorsky H-53, a family of military helicopters
- Washinosu Station, in Yakumo, Hokkaido, Japan
- Seaplane Hangar H53, now Hangar H, in Copenhagen, Denmark
