= Nodaoi Station =

Railway station in Yakumo, Hokkaido, Japan

Coordinates: 42.2166°N 140.3766°E

Nodaoi Station (野田生駅, Nodaoi-eki) is a railway station in Yakumo, Futami District, Hokkaidō Prefecture, Japan.

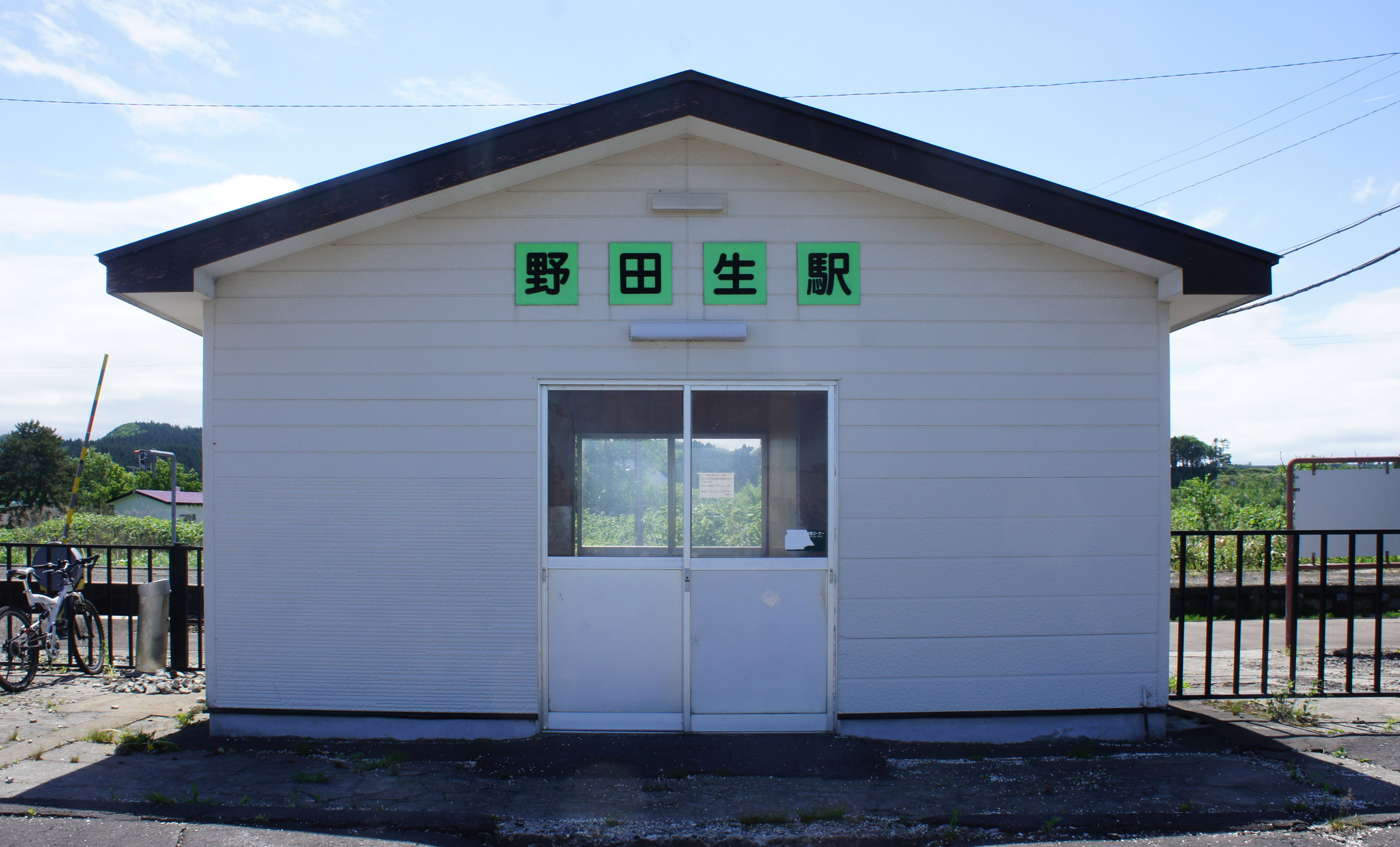
JR Hakodate-Main-Line, Nodaoi Station building

== Lines ==
- Hokkaido Railway Company
  - Hakodate Main Line Station H56

== Adjacent stations ==
«	Service	»
Hakodate Main Line
Otoshibe	Local	Yamakoshi
