= Yamakoshi Station =

Railway station in Yakumo, Hokkaido, Japan

Coordinates: 42.2313°N 140.3264°E

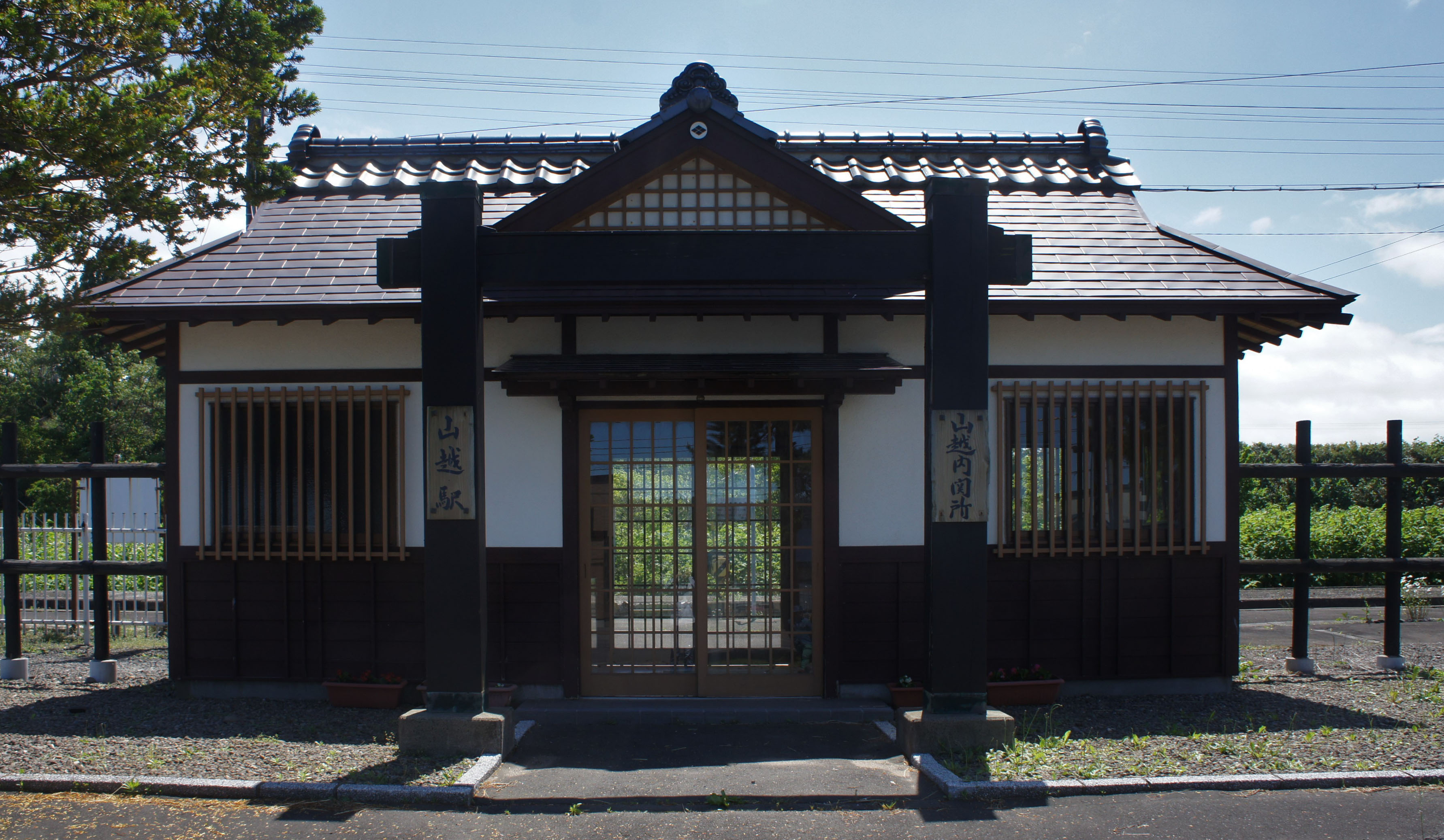
- station building

General information
- Line: Hakodate Main Line
Location

Yamakoshi Station (山越駅, Yamakoshi-eki) is a railway station in Yakumo, Futami District, Hokkaidō Prefecture, Japan.

== Lines ==
- Hokkaido Railway Company
  - Hakodate Main Line Station H55

== History ==
=== Future plans ===
In June 2023, this station was selected to be among 42 stations on the JR Hokkaido network to be slated for abolition owing to low ridership.

== Adjacent stations ==
«	Service	»
Hakodate Main Line
Nodaoi	Local	Yakumo
