= Yakumo Station =

Railway station in Yakumo, Hokkaido, Japan

Coordinates: 42.2536°N 140.2735°E

H54 Yakumo Station 八雲駅
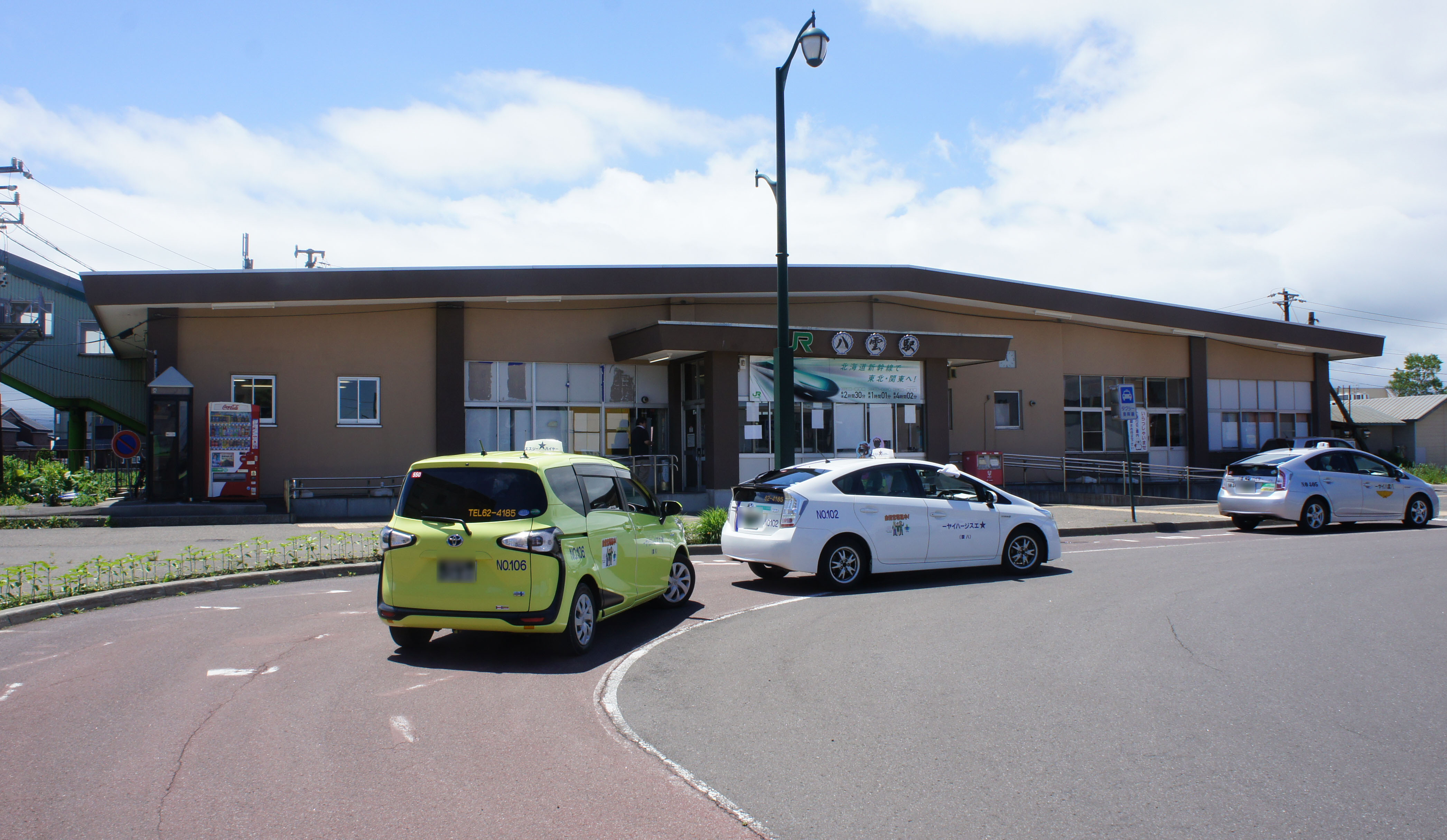
- The station

General information
- Location: 125-1, Honcho, Yakumo-cho, Futakai-gun, Hokkaido; Japan
- Operator: JR Hokkaido
- Line: ■ Hakodate Main Line
- Platforms: 1 side + 1 island platform
- Tracks: 3

Other information
- Station code: H54
- Website: Official website

History
- Opened: 3 November 1903
Location
- Location within Japan

Yakumo Station (八雲駅, Yakumo-eki) is a railway station on the Hakodate Main Line in Yakumo, Futami District, Hokkaido, Japan, operated by Hokkaido Railway Company (JR Hokkaido).

== Lines ==
Yakumo Station is served by the Hakodate Main Line, and is numbered "H54".

== Station layout ==
Yakumo Station has a single side platform (platform 1) and an island platform (platforms 3 and 4) connected by a footbridge.

=== Platforms ===
1	■ Hakodate Main Line	for Mori and Hakodate
3	■ Hakodate Main Line	for Oshamambe, Higashi-Muroran, and Sapporo
4	■ Hakodate Main Line	(not normally used)

== Adjacent stations ==
«	Service	»
Hakodate Main Line
Yamakoshi	Local	Yamasaki

== History ==
The station opened on 3 November 1903. With the privatization of Japanese National Railways (JNR) on 1 April 1987, the station came under the control of JR Hokkaido.

== See also ==
- List of railway stations in Japan
