= Shizukari Station =

Railway station in Oshamambe, Hokkaido, Japan

Coordinates: 42.5841°N 140.4597°E

H46 Shizukari Station 静狩駅
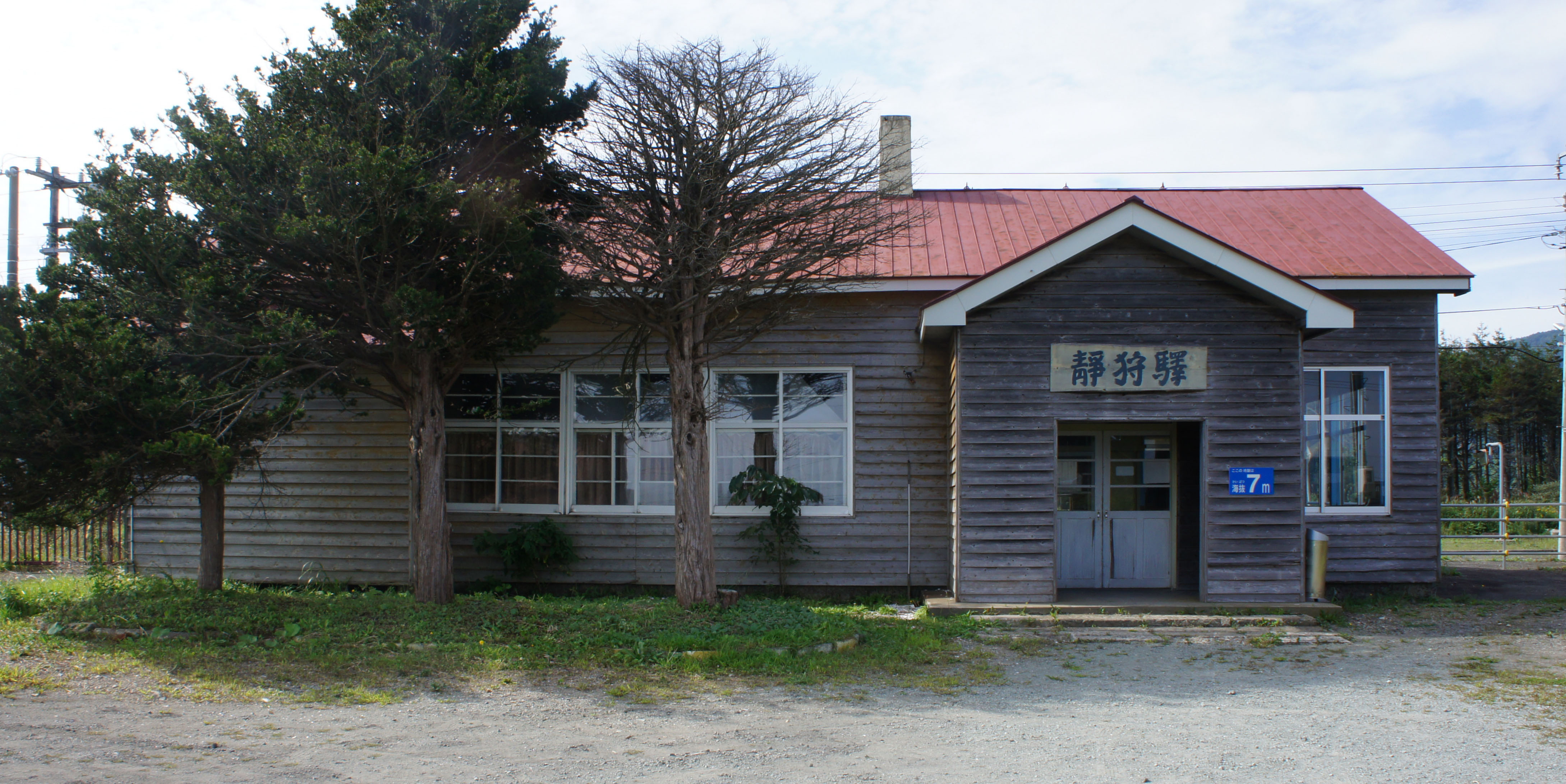
- Shizukari Station in September 2017

General information
- Location: Shizukari, Oshamambe Town, Yamakoshi District; Hokkaido Prefecture; Japan
- Operator: JR Hokkaido
- Platforms: 1 side platform and 1 island platform
- Tracks: 3

Other information
- Station code: H46

History
- Opened: 10 December 1923; 102 years ago

Passengers
- 2014: 4 daily

Services
Preceding station	JR Hokkaido	Following station
Oshamambe H47 Terminus	Muroran Main Line	Koboro H45 towards Iwamizawa
Location
- Location within Hokkaido Location within Japan

Shizukari Station (静狩駅, Shizukari-eki) is a railway station on the Muroran Main Line in Oshamambe, Hokkaido, Japan, operated by the Hokkaido Railway Company (JR Hokkaido).

== Lines ==
Shizukari Station is served by the Muroran Main Line, and is numbered "H46".

== History ==
The station opened on 10 December 1923. With the privatization of Japanese National Railways (JNR) on 1 April 1987, the station came under the control of JR Hokkaido.

=== Future plans ===
In June 2023, this station was selected to be among 42 stations on the JR Hokkaido network to be slated for abolition owing to low ridership.

== See also ==
- List of railway stations in Japan
