= Otoshibe Station =

Railway station in Yakumo, Hokkaido, Japan

Coordinates: 42.1877°N 140.4206°E

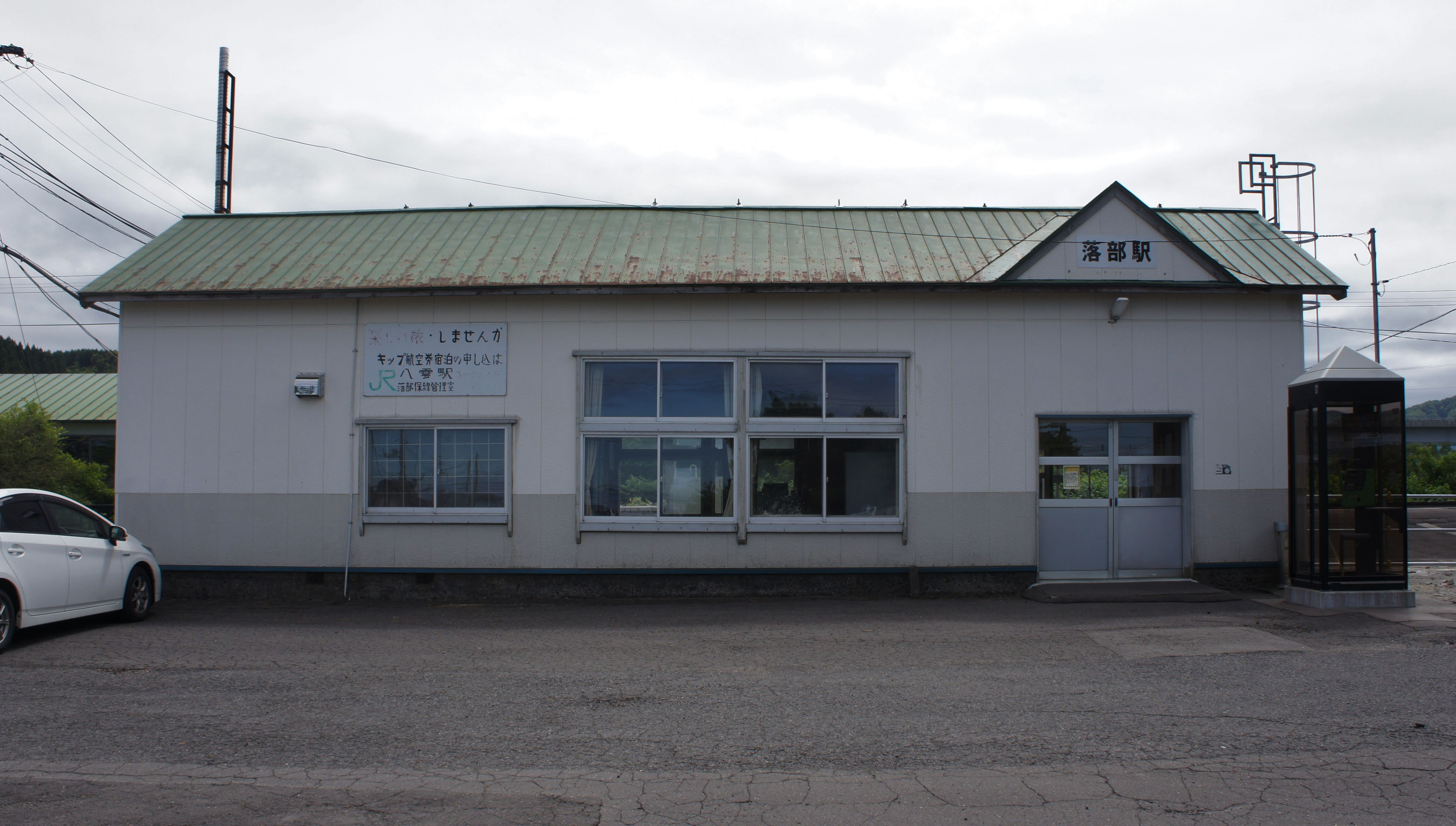
The Station in 2018

Otoshibe Station (落部駅, Otoshibe-eki) is a railway station in Yakumo, Futami District, Hokkaidō Prefecture, Japan.

== Lines ==
- Hokkaido Railway Company
  - Hakodate Main Line Station H57

== Adjacent stations ==
«	Service	»
Hakodate Main Line
Ishikura	Local	Nodaoi
