= H45 =

H45 may refer to:

- Hamilton H-45, a six-passenger-seat, all-metal, high-wing monoplane
- HMS Acheron (H45), an A-class destroyer
- Koboro Station, a Japanese railway station with code H45
