= Pokémon Fossil Museum =

Touring museum exhibit

- Poster for the National Museum of Nature and Science's hosting of the exhibit (art by Hitoshi Ariga) featuring Pikachu at the center, with various Pokémon on the left and real-life prehistoric animals on the right
- Status: Active
- Genre: Exhibition
- Begins: 4 July 2021
- Country: Japan
- Organizer: National Museum of Nature and Science and host museums
- People: Daisuke Aiba (general supervisor)
- Website: www.kahaku.go.jp/pokemon/index_en.html

The Pokémon Fossil Museum (Japanese: ポケモン化石博物館, Hepburn: Pokemon kaseki hakubutsukan) is a travelling exhibition based on the Pokémon media franchise, displaying illustrations and "life-size" sculpted renditions of the skeletons of fossil Pokémon, along with the actual fossils of the real-life prehistoric animals and other organisms on which they were based. The exhibit was created by the National Museum of Nature and Science and the Pokémon Company.

The Pokémon Fossil Museum opened at the Mikasa City Museum in Mikasa, Hokkaido, Japan, on 4 July 2021, and remained there until 20 September. It has since travelled to other museums, and was on display at the Mie Prefectural Museum from 17 January until 5 April 2026.

In July 2022, a virtual tour of the exhibit was made available online, with virtual reality (VR) headset compatibility.

The Pokémon Fossil Museum's last appearance in Japan was at the Mie Prefectural Museum from 17 January 2026 to 5 April 2026. The Field Museum in Chicago, Illinois, is hosting the exhibit in its first stop outside of Japan from 22 May 2026 to 11 April 2027.

== Overview ==
The Pokémon media franchise, created by Satoshi Tajiri in 1996, is centered on fictional creatures called "Pokémon". In the Pokémon video games and related media, the term "fossil Pokémon" is used to refer to both ancient Pokémon brought back to life from extinction by resurrecting their fossils, and their evolutions.

Designed to educate children about fossils and dinosaurs, the Pokémon Fossil Museum features "life-size", three-dimensional sculpted models of the skeletons of fossil Pokémon, along with illustrations of the Pokémon and diagrams of their fictional skeletal structures; alongside the Pokémon are illustrations and actual excavated fossils of their real-life prehistoric counterparts, with informational signs providing facts about the animals and organisms upon which the Pokémon were based. The layout of the exhibition is intended to allow visitors to compare the fictional Pokémon with their real-life inspirations. Some of the comparisons featured in the exhibit include Omanyte and ammonites; Aerodactyl and pterosaurs; Archen and Archaeopteryx; Tyrantrum and Tyrannosaurus; Aurorus and Amargasaurus; and Bastiodon and ceratopsian dinosaurs like Triceratops. Also featured are fossil Pokémon based on living fossils—extant taxon that cosmetically resemble related species from the fossil record—such as Kabuto and horseshoe crabs, and Relicanth and coelacanths. Throughout the exhibit are images of "excavator Pikachu", a Pikachu wearing a hat with a fossil motif.

== History ==
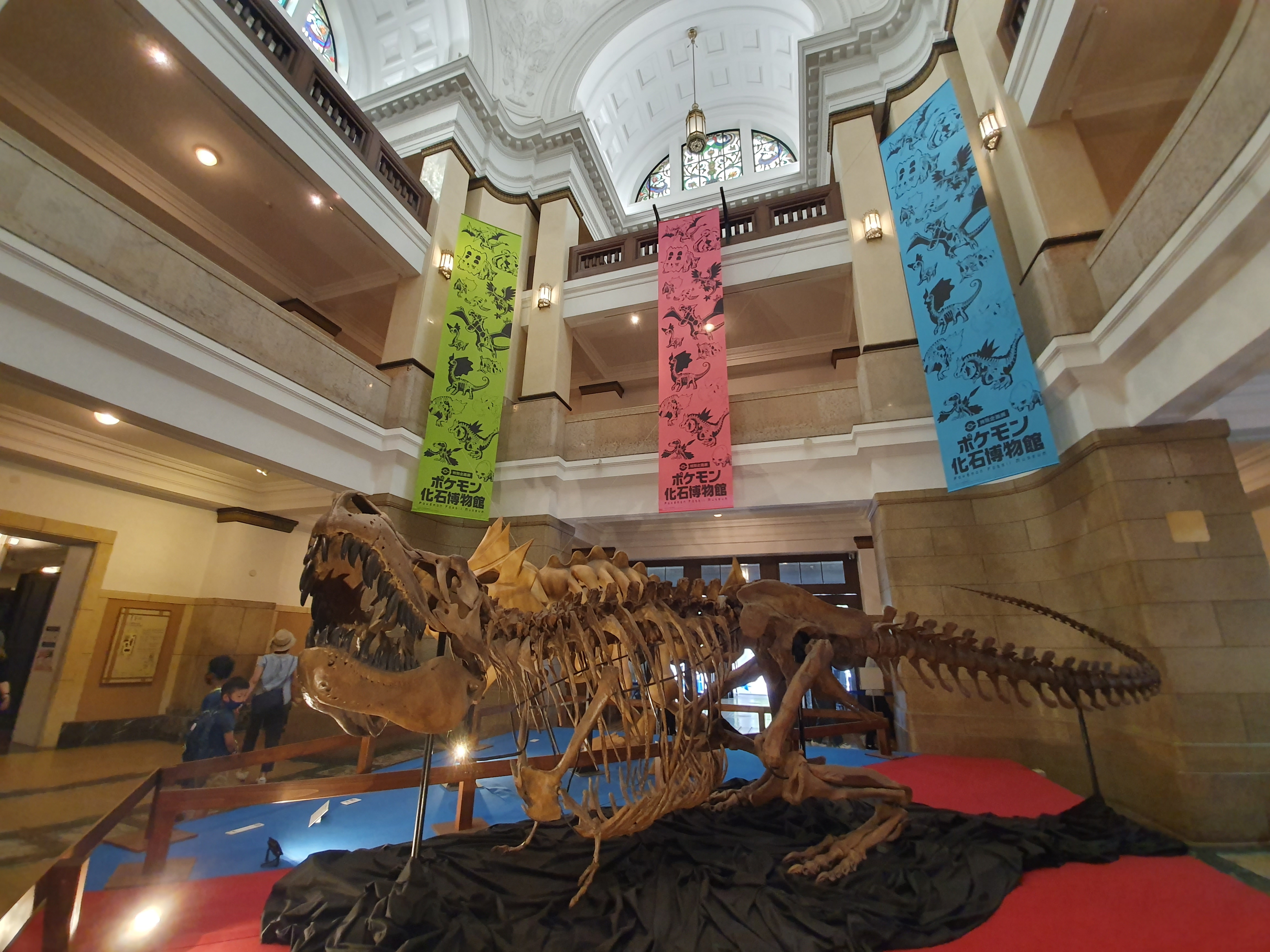
Entrance to the exhibit in the National Museum of Nature and Science in 2022

The Pokémon Fossil Museum was proposed and its development overseen by Daisuke Aiba, a senior researcher for the Mikasa City Museum, who conceived the idea in 2019. In an interview with Oricon, Aiba stated, "Since I was a child, I have loved Pokémon and paleontology," and explained that he and the other organizers of the exhibit wanted to introduce paleontology to children through the use of fossil Pokémon. Biological illustrator Genya Masukawa and artist Hitoshi Ariga provided the illustrations for the exhibition.

The exhibition first opened at the Mikasa City Museum in Mikasa, Hokkaido, on 4 July 2021, and remained there until 20 September. It then moved to the Shimane Nature Museum of Mt. Sanbe in Ōda, Shimane, from 9 October 2021 to 30 January 2022, before travelling to the Toyohashi Museum of Natural History in Toyohashi, where it opened on 16 July 2022. Due to rain, the opening ceremony was held inside the building, and featured a ribbon cutting attended by Toyohashi mayor Koichi Sahara, representative students from Futagawa Elementary School, and a costumed mascot of excavator Pikachu. Additionally, four Pokéfuta (manhole covers decorated with drawings of Pokémon) were unveiled, with intentions to place them around the city.

That same month, a virtual tour of the Pokémon Fossil Museum was made available online. As well as being able to virtually explore the exhibition using a smartphone or computer, there is an option to navigate it using a virtual reality (VR) headset, with the website recommending the use of the Oculus Quest 2.

== Attendance and reception ==
Field Museum in November 2026 with Pokémon Fossil Museum promotions

On 10 October 2022, the total number of visitors to the Pokémon Fossil Museum at the Toyohashi Museum of Natural History surpassed 100,000, with the 100,000th family to attend being given a commemorative gift. By the time the exhibit ended its 99-day run at the museum on 6 November 2022, the total attendance count was estimated at over 138,000; this broke previous record for the number of visitors to a special exhibition at the Toyohashi Museum, held by The World of Dinosaurs Revived (今よみがえる恐竜の世界, Ima yomigaeru kyōryū no sekai), which attracted 53,000 visitors in 1993 over a 57-day run.

On 18 December 2022, the total number of visitors to the exhibit at the Ōita Prefectural Art Museum surpassed 10,000; the 10,000th family to attend received a stuffed toy as a souvenir. On 5 January 2023, the total number of visitors to the Ōita exhibit surpassed 30,000.

On 18 February 2024, the total attendance for the exhibit at the Iwate Prefectural Museum reached 30,000 visitors.

Melissa T. Miller of Nerdist, in an article about the virtual tour of the exhibit, wrote that it successfully demonstrates the influence of zoology on the design of Pokémon, and that, though the displays throughout the exhibit feature Japanese text, "they include enough pictures and obvious comparisons between the real-life animals and Pokémon to make it universally interesting."

== Dates at museums ==
Museum	Location	Opened	Closed	Ref(s)
Mikasa City Museum	Mikasa, Hokkaido, Japan	4 July 2021	20 September 2021	
Shimane Nature Museum of Mt. Sanbe	Ōda, Shimane, Japan	9 October 2021	30 January 2022	
National Museum of Nature and Science	Ueno, Tokyo, Japan	15 March 2022	19 June 2022	
Toyohashi Museum of Natural History	Toyohashi, Japan	16 July 2022	6 November 2022	
Ōita Prefectural Art Museum	Ōita, Japan	10 December 2022	24 January 2023	
Niigata Science Museum	Niigata, Japan	4 March 2023	25 June 2023	
Gunma Museum of Natural History	Tomioka, Japan	15 July 2023	18 September 2023	
Gunma Museum of Natural History	Tomioka, Japan	23 September 2023	3 December 2023	
Iwate Prefectural Museum	Morioka, Japan	19 December 2023	3 March 2024	
Mifune Dinosaur Museum	Kumamoto Prefecture, Japan	20 March 2024	23 June 2024	
Gifu Prefectural Museum	Seki, Gifu, Japan	19 July 2024	27 October 2024	
Hofu Science Museum "Solar"	Yamaguchi Prefecture, Japan	9 November 2024	25 February 2025	
Fukui Prefectural Dinosaur Museum	Fukui Prefecture, Japan	8 March 2024	25 May 2025	
Nagasaki City Dinosaur Museum	Nagasaki Prefecture, Japan	7 June 2025	21 September 2025	
Tokushima Prefectural Museum	Tokushima Prefecture, Japan	4 October 2025	28 December 2025	
Mie Prefectural Museum	Mie Prefecture, Japan	17 January 2026	5 April 2026	
Field Museum of Natural History	Chicago, Illinois, United States	22 May 2026	11 April 2027	
Denver Museum of Nature and Science	Denver, Colorado, United States	27 May 2027	2 January 2028	

== See also ==
- PokéPark — a travelling theme park that existed in 2005 and 2006
