= Futamata Station =

Futamata Station is the name of two train stations in Japan:

- Futamata Station (Hokkaidō) (二股駅)
- Futamata Station (Kyoto) (二俣駅)
