= Yakumo, Hokkaido =

Yakumo 八雲町
- Town
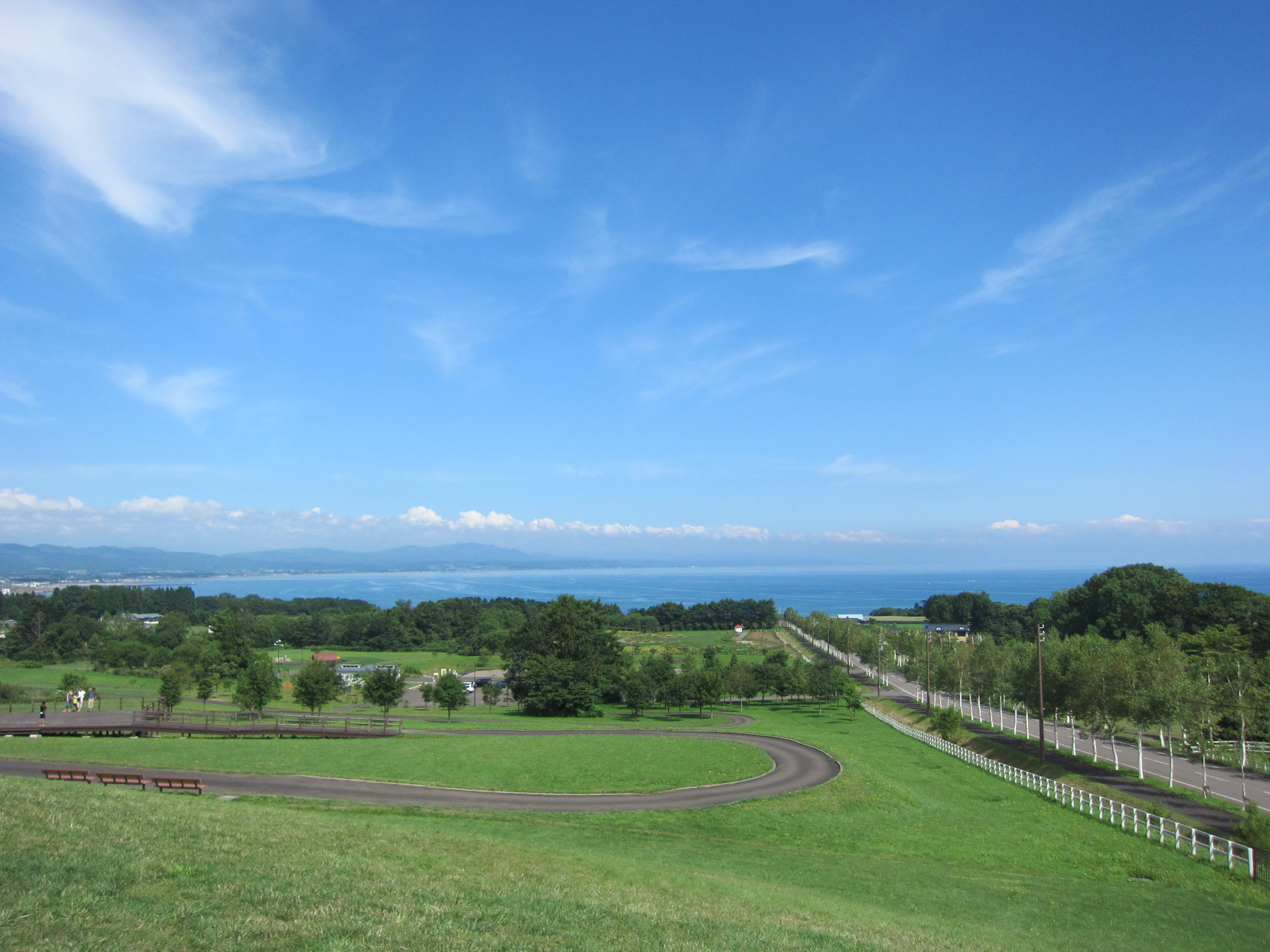
- View over Yakumo-chō

- Flag Seal

- Location of Yakumo in Hokkaido

- Location in Japan
- Coordinates: 42°15′N 140°16′E
- Country: Japan
- Region: Hokkaido
- Prefecture: Hokkaido
- District: Futami

Government
  - Mayor: Katsunori Iwamura

Area
  - Total: 955.98 km^{2} (369.11 sq mi)

Population (2016-09-30)
  - Total: 17,299
  - Density: 18.096/km^{2} (46.867/sq mi)
- Time zone: UTC+09:00 (JST)
- City hall address: 138-1, Sumizome-chō, Yakumo-cho, Futami-gun, Hokkaidō; 049-3192
- Climate: Dfb
- Website: www.town.yakumo.lg.jp
- Symbols
- Bird: Steller's sea eagle
- Flower: Sunflower
- Tree: Japanese yew

Yakumo (八雲町, Yakumo-chō) is a town in Oshima Subprefecture, Hokkaido, Japan.

As of September 2016, the town's population was estimated as 17,299, with a density of 18 persons per km^{2}. The total area is 955.98 km^{2}.

On October 1, 2005, the town of Kumaishi was merged into Yakumo; now in the newly created Futami District. The former town of Kumaishi joined Oshima Subprefecture at the same time.

== Geography ==
Yakumo is the only municipality which faces both the Sea of Japan and the Pacific Ocean. The Yakumo area and the Kumaishi area are separated by mountains.

The name comes from the word "Yakumo" in the Waka composed by Susanoo-no-Mikoto.

=== Neighboring municipalities ===
- Hiyama Subprefecture
  - Assabu
  - Imakane
  - Otobe
  - Setana
- Oshima Subprefecture
  - Mori
  - Oshamanbe

=== Climate ===
Climate data for Yakumo, Hokkaido (1991−2020 normals, extremes 1977−present)
Month	Jan	Feb	Mar	Apr	May	Jun	Jul	Aug	Sep	Oct	Nov	Dec	Year
Record high °C (°F)	9.1 (48.4)	9.4 (48.9)	16.0 (60.8)	24.2 (75.6)	27.5 (81.5)	30.4 (86.7)	33.5 (92.3)	33.4 (92.1)	31.6 (88.9)	25.9 (78.6)	20.3 (68.5)	15.5 (59.9)	33.5 (92.3)
Mean daily maximum °C (°F)	−0.1 (31.8)	0.7 (33.3)	4.5 (40.1)	10.1 (50.2)	15.0 (59.0)	18.5 (65.3)	22.4 (72.3)	24.7 (76.5)	22.4 (72.3)	16.3 (61.3)	9.0 (48.2)	2.1 (35.8)	12.1 (53.8)
Daily mean °C (°F)	−3.3 (26.1)	−2.8 (27.0)	0.7 (33.3)	5.9 (42.6)	10.7 (51.3)	14.7 (58.5)	19.0 (66.2)	20.9 (69.6)	17.6 (63.7)	11.1 (52.0)	4.7 (40.5)	−1.2 (29.8)	8.2 (46.7)
Mean daily minimum °C (°F)	−7.1 (19.2)	−6.9 (19.6)	−3.4 (25.9)	1.5 (34.7)	6.6 (43.9)	11.4 (52.5)	16.2 (61.2)	17.6 (63.7)	12.9 (55.2)	6.0 (42.8)	0.4 (32.7)	−4.7 (23.5)	4.2 (39.6)
Record low °C (°F)	−18.3 (−0.9)	−19.0 (−2.2)	−14.1 (6.6)	−8.9 (16.0)	−1.4 (29.5)	1.8 (35.2)	6.7 (44.1)	8.8 (47.8)	3.4 (38.1)	−1.9 (28.6)	−8.3 (17.1)	−14.4 (6.1)	−19.0 (−2.2)
Average precipitation mm (inches)	74.2 (2.92)	69.9 (2.75)	69.4 (2.73)	84.0 (3.31)	100.1 (3.94)	77.9 (3.07)	132.5 (5.22)	195.2 (7.69)	157.9 (6.22)	103.9 (4.09)	116.6 (4.59)	99.1 (3.90)	1,294.1 (50.95)
Average snowfall cm (inches)	185 (73)	153 (60)	99 (39)	9 (3.5)	0 (0)	0 (0)	0 (0)	0 (0)	0 (0)	0 (0)	35 (14)	150 (59)	628 (247)
Average rainy days	17.2	15.3	12.9	10.4	10.5	8.4	9.8	10.3	11.0	12.2	15.2	17.8	151
Average snowy days	20.2	17.8	13.4	1.6	0	0	0	0	0	0	4.0	16.9	73.9
Mean monthly sunshine hours	64.8	83.4	134.4	177.0	181.1	138.2	116.5	139.7	159.0	148.0	91.4	64.6	1,500.9
Source 1: JMA
Source 2: JMA

== History ==
- 1881: The village of Yakumo was founded in Yamakosi District.
- 1902:
  - Yakumo village and Yamakoshinai village were merged to form the new village of Yakumo.
  - Kumaishi village was founded in Nishi District, Hiyama Subprefecture.
- 1919: Yakumo village became Yakumo town.
- 1957: Otoshibe village in Kayabe District was merged into Yakumo town.
- 1962: Kumaishi village became Kumaishi town.
- 2005: Yakumo town and Kumaishi town was merged to form new town of Yakumo in Futami District. (Because of it, Hiyama Subprefecture was divided between north and south.)

== Education ==
- High schools
  - Hokkaido Yakumo High School
  - Hokkaido Kumaishi High School

== Transportation ==
=== Railway ===
- Hakodate Main Line: Otoshibe - Nodaoi - Yamakoshi - Yakumo - Washinosu - Yamasaki - Kuroiwa

=== Highway ===
- Hokkaido Expressway: Yakumo IC - Yakumo PA - Otoshibe IC
- National Route 5
- National Route 229
- National Route 277

== Sister city ==
- (Aichi Prefecture) Komaki, Aichi

== Notable people from Yakumo ==
- Goro Ibuki, actor
- Masahiro Kobayashi, actor
- Yukari Konishi, sport shooter
