= Mikasa City Museum =

- 三笠市立博物館
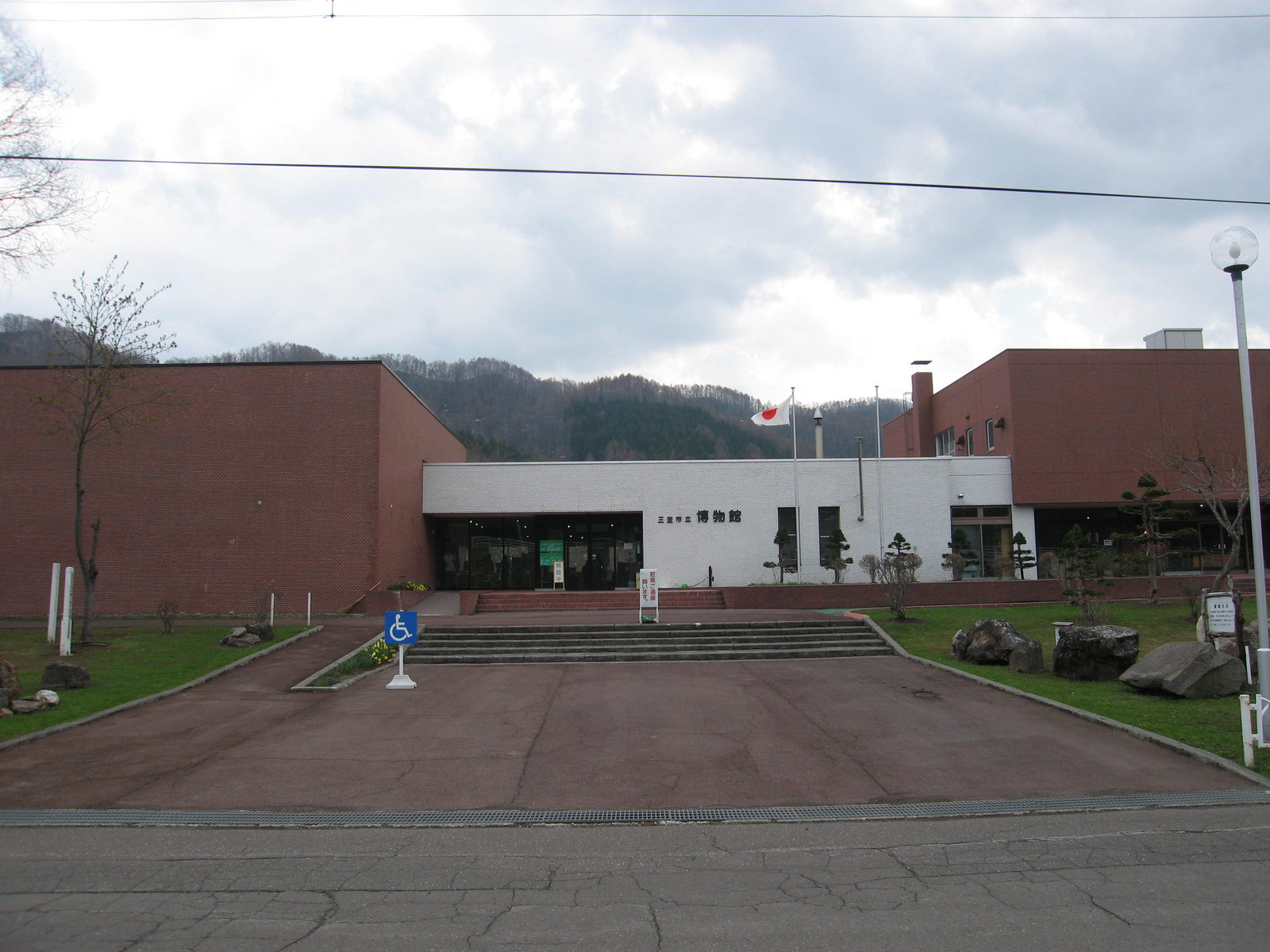
- Interactive map of the Mikasa City Museum area

General information
- Location: 1-212-1 Ikushunbetsu, Nishiki-chō, Mikasa, Hokkaidō, Japan
- Coordinates: 43°15′40″N 141°57′45″E
- Opened: July 1979

Website
- Official website

Mikasa City Museum (三笠市立博物館, Mikasa-shi Hakubutsukan) opened in Mikasa, Hokkaidō, Japan in 1979. The collection documents the natural history and history of the area and is renowned for its ammonites as well as for the Yezo Mikasa Ryū type fossil, discovered in 1976 and designated a Natural Monument.

== See also ==
- Ishikari coalfield
- List of Natural Monuments of Japan (Hokkaidō)
- Pokémon Fossil Museum — a travelling exhibition hosted by the Mikasa City Museum from 4 July to 20 September 2021
