= Washinosu Station =

Former railway station in Yakumo, Hokkaido, Japan

Coordinates: 42.2785°N 140.2694°E

Washinosu Station 鷲ノ巣駅
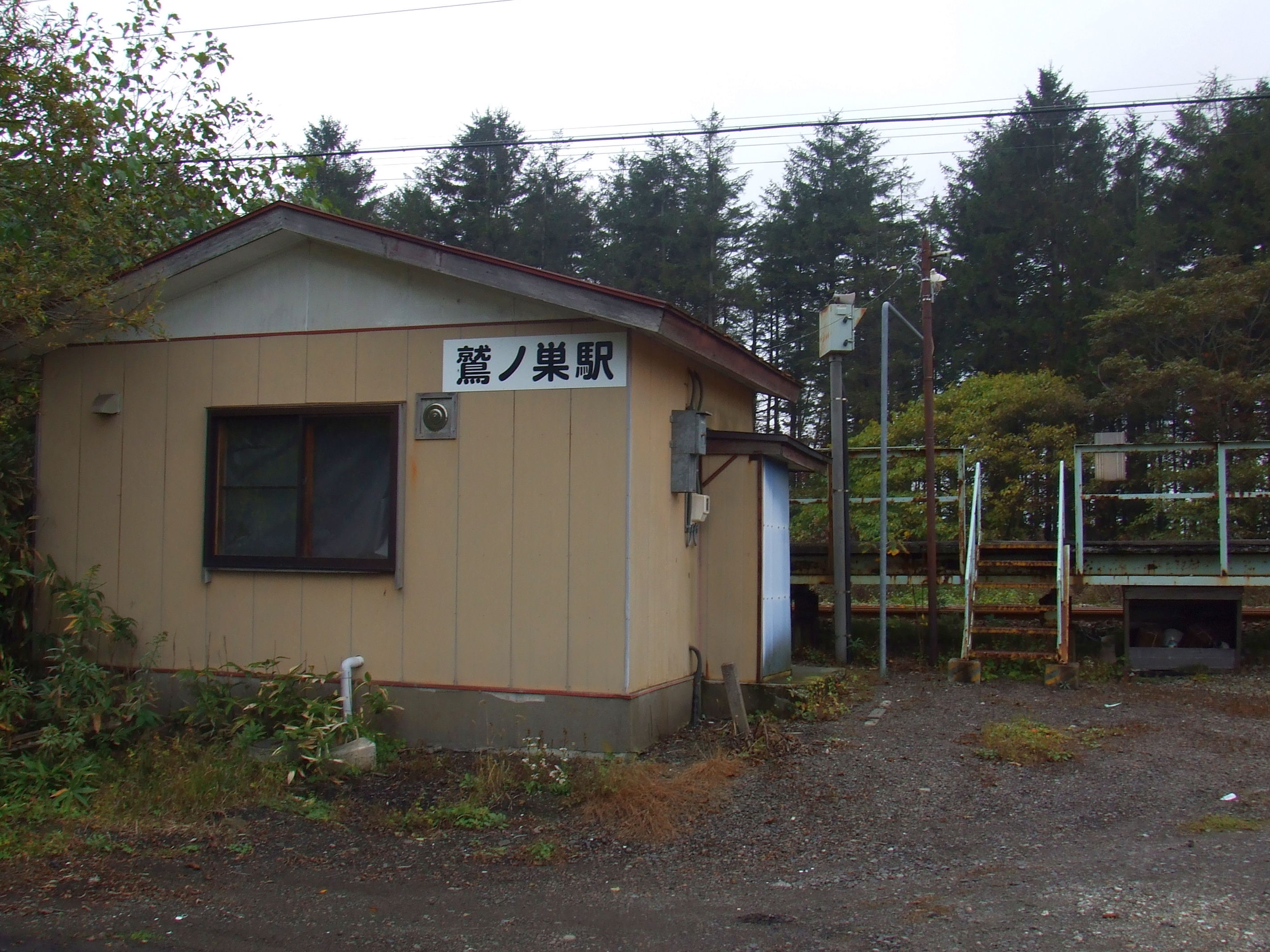
- The station in October 2008

General information
- Location: Yakumo, Futami District, Hokkaido; Japan
- Operator: JR Hokkaido
- Line: ■ Hakodate Main Line
- Distance: 84.2 km from Hakodate
- Platforms: 2 side platforms
- Tracks: 2

Other information
- Status: Closed
- Station code: H53

History
- Opened: 1 September 1944
- Closed: 25 March 2016
Location
- Location within Japan

Washinosu Station (鷲ノ巣駅, Washinosu-eki) was a railway station on the Hakodate Main Line in Yakumo, Futami District, Hokkaido, Japan, operated by Hokkaido Railway Company (JR Hokkaido) until its closure on 25 March 2016.

== Lines ==
Washinosu Station was served by the Hakodate Main Line, and was numbered "H53".

== Station layout ==
The station consisted of two staggered side platforms, accessed by a level crossing for passengers.

== History ==
The station opened on 1 September 1944 as a passing loop on the otherwise single-track line with platforms provided to allow passengers to board and alight. From 1 August 1949, it was officially designated as a "temporary station", but from 30 September 1962, returned to its original designation as a passing loop that also handled passengers. With the privatization of Japanese National Railways (JNR) on 1 April 1987, the station came under the control of JR Hokkaido, and officially became a fully-fledged station.

In September 2015, it was announced that JR Hokkaido planned to close this station in March 2016. The station closed following the last day of services on 25 March 2016.

== Surrounding area ==
- National Route 5

== See also ==
- List of railway stations in Japan
