= Futamata Station (Hokkaido) =

Former railway station in Oshamambe, Hokkaido, Japan

S32 Futamata Station 二股駅
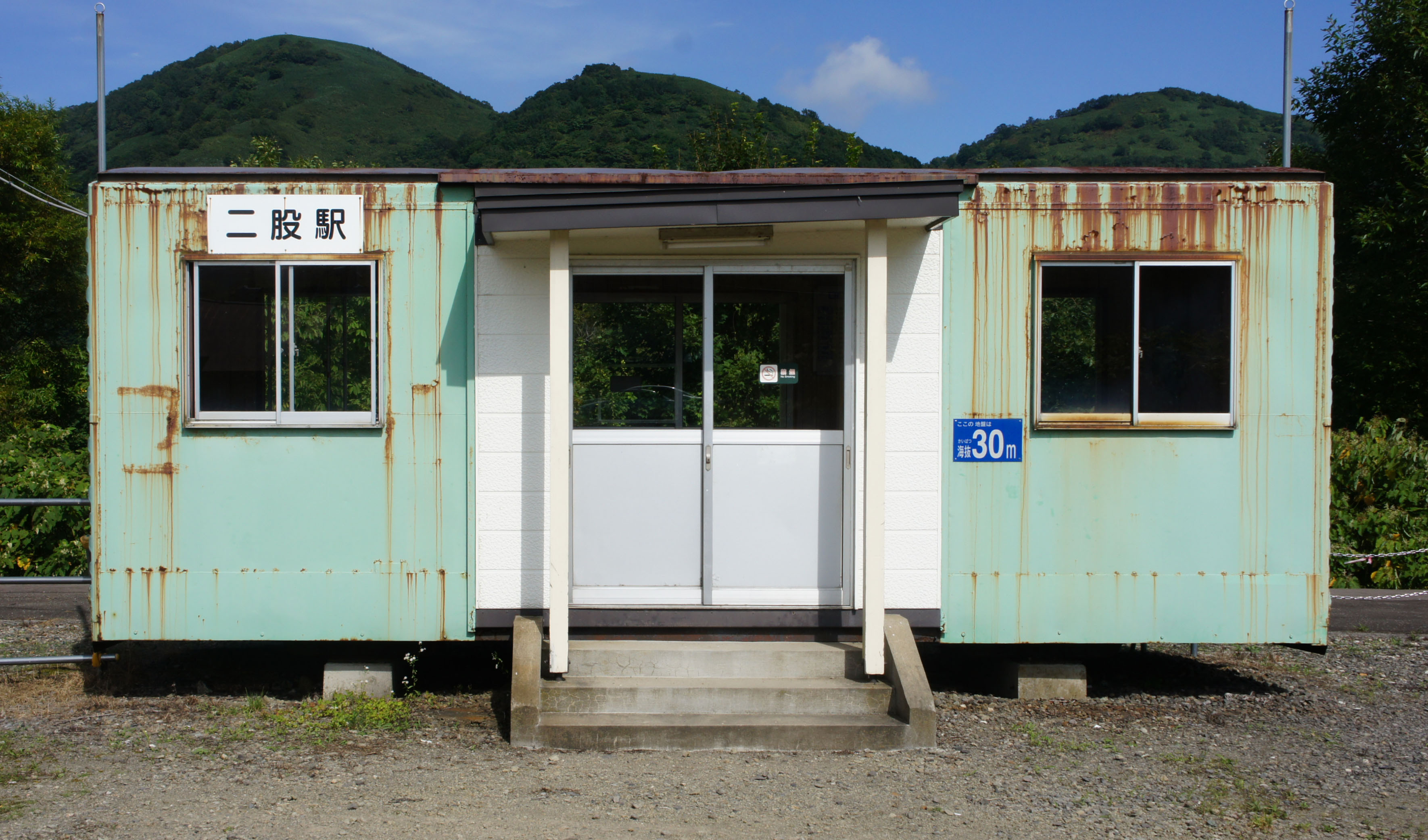
- Station building, converted from a former freight car

General information
- Location: Aza Futaba, Oshamambe, Yamakoshi, Hokkaido （北海道山越郡長万部町字双葉） Japan
- Coordinates: 42°34′33″N 140°19′15″E
- Operator: JR Hokkaido
- Line: Hakodate Main Line
- Connections: Bus stop

Other information
- Station code: S32

History
- Opened: 3 November 1903
- Closed: 14 March 2026

Passengers
- 1992: 48 daily

Services
Preceding station	JR Hokkaido	Following station
Oshamanbe H47 towards Hakodate	Hakodate Main Line	Kuromatsunai S30 towards Asahikawa
Location

Futamata Station (二股駅, Futamata-eki) was a railway station in Oshamambe, Hokkaidō, Japan operated by the Hokkaido Railway Company (JR Hokkaido). It was numbered S32.

== Lines ==
Futamata Station was served by the Hakodate Main Line.

== Station layout ==
Futamata Station had a single side platform.

=== Platforms ===
1	■ Hakodate Main Line	for Oshamambe, Kutchan, Otaru, and Sapporo

== History ==
The station opened on 3 November 1903.

In June 2023, this station was selected to be among 42 stations on the JR Hokkaido network to be slated for abolition owing to low ridership. The last train served the station on 13 March 2026 and the station was closed the next day.

== Surroundings ==
- Route 5
- Futamata Radium Onsen
- Niseko Bus "Futamata Station" Bus Stop
