= Nishi District, Hokkaido =

District in Hokkaido, Japan

Coordinates: 42.022°N 140.186°E

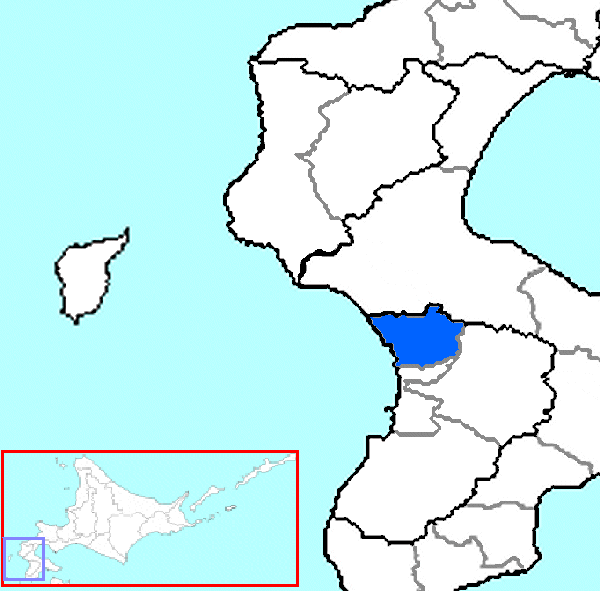
Nishi District in Hiyama Subprefecture

Nishi (爾志郡, Nishi-gun) is a district located in Hiyama Subprefecture, Hokkaido, Japan.

As of 2004, the district has an estimated population of 8,357 and a density of 21.82 persons per km^{2}. The total area is 382.93 km^{2}.

== Towns and villages ==
- Otobe

== Merger ==
- On October 1, 2005, the old town of Yakumo (from Yamakoshi District) absorbed the town of Kumaishi (from Nishi District, Hiyama Subprefecture) to create the new and expanded town of Yakumo (now in the newly created Futami District, Oshima Subprefecture). The former town of Kumaishi moved to Oshima Subprefecture at the same time.
