= Kumaishi, Hokkaido =

Kumaishi 熊石町
- Town
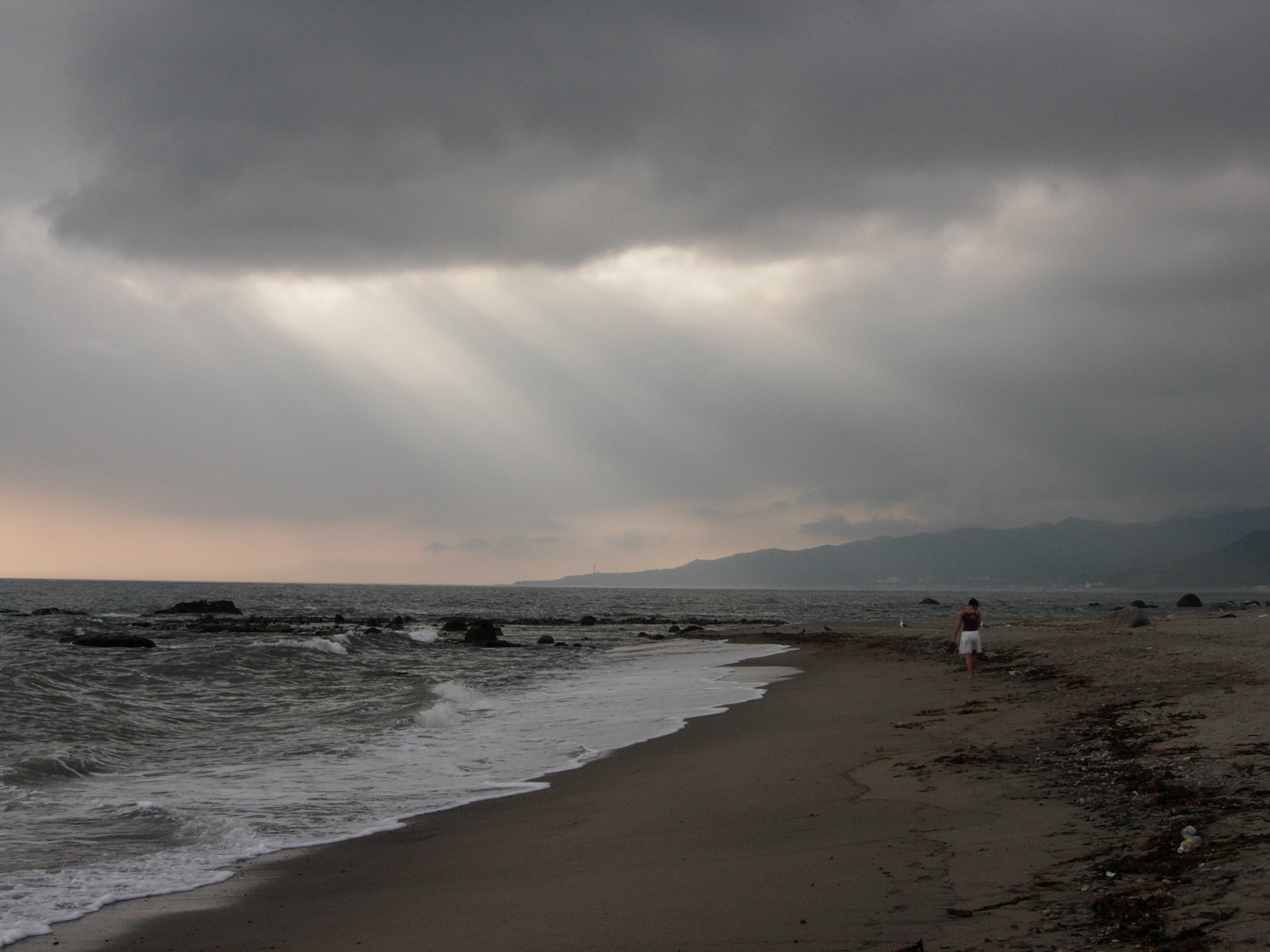
- The Kumaishi Coastline

- Flag Emblem

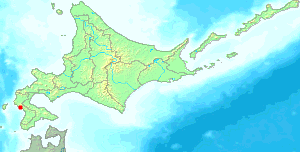
- Location of Kumaishi in Hokkaido (Hiyama Subprefecture)

- Location in Japan
- Coordinates: 42°7′N 139°58′E
- Country: Japan
- Region: Hokkaido
- Prefecture: Hokkaido (Hiyama Subprefecture)
- Now part of Yakumo: October 1, 2005

Area
  - Total: 220.38 km^{2} (85.09 sq mi)

Population (September 30, 2005)
  - Total: 3,468
- Time zone: UTC+09:00 (JST)
- City hall address: 116 Aza-Nezaki, Kumaishi Town, Ershi-gun, Hokkaido; 043-0495
- Website: web.archive.org/web/20050920143633/http://www.town.kumaishi.hokkaido.jp/
- Symbols
- Flower: Narcissus
- Tree: Ginkgo biloba

Kumaishi (熊石町, Kumaishi-chō) was a town located in Nishi District, Oshima Subprefecture, Hokkaido, Japan.

The town's name translates as bear rock after a prominent rock formation that looks like a bear and cub on its coast.

As of 2004, the town had an estimated population of 3,487 and a density of 15.82 persons per km^{2}. The total area was 220.38 km^{2}.

As many "town" districts, Kumaishi itself is composed of many smaller villages strung out along the coast facing the Sea of Japan. Its industry consists mainly of fishing, most notably squid fishing. At night, squid fishing fleets can be seen far out in the sea because of bioluminescence. The area contains some rare untouched Japanese wilderness, although some of the coastline has seen Japanese style engineering and been "decorated" with concrete "tetrapods".

== History ==
On October 1, 2005, Kumaishi was merged with the old town of Yakumo (formerly from Yamakoshi District, Oshima Subprefecture) to create the new and expanded town of Yakumo (now in the newly created Futami District, Oshima Subprefecture). Therefore, Kumaishi was transferred from Hiyama Subprefecture to Oshima Subprefecture as a result of financial difficulties.

== Climate ==
Climate data for Kumaishi, Hokkaido (1991−2020 normals, extremes 1977−present)
Month	Jan	Feb	Mar	Apr	May	Jun	Jul	Aug	Sep	Oct	Nov	Dec	Year
Record high °C (°F)	9.4 (48.9)	11.8 (53.2)	15.0 (59.0)	22.5 (72.5)	26.0 (78.8)	28.9 (84.0)	33.3 (91.9)	33.5 (92.3)	31.9 (89.4)	24.4 (75.9)	19.9 (67.8)	14.9 (58.8)	33.5 (92.3)
Mean daily maximum °C (°F)	0.6 (33.1)	1.3 (34.3)	5.0 (41.0)	10.6 (51.1)	15.7 (60.3)	19.8 (67.6)	23.4 (74.1)	25.7 (78.3)	22.8 (73.0)	16.7 (62.1)	9.5 (49.1)	3.0 (37.4)	12.8 (55.1)
Daily mean °C (°F)	−2.0 (28.4)	−1.4 (29.5)	1.8 (35.2)	7.0 (44.6)	11.8 (53.2)	16.0 (60.8)	20.1 (68.2)	21.9 (71.4)	18.7 (65.7)	12.7 (54.9)	6.2 (43.2)	0.2 (32.4)	9.4 (49.0)
Mean daily minimum °C (°F)	−4.7 (23.5)	−4.3 (24.3)	−1.5 (29.3)	3.0 (37.4)	7.9 (46.2)	12.6 (54.7)	17.2 (63.0)	18.6 (65.5)	14.8 (58.6)	8.7 (47.7)	2.7 (36.9)	−2.5 (27.5)	6.0 (42.9)
Record low °C (°F)	−12.8 (9.0)	−13.7 (7.3)	−9.4 (15.1)	−4.6 (23.7)	0.4 (32.7)	4.6 (40.3)	9.6 (49.3)	11.0 (51.8)	5.6 (42.1)	−0.3 (31.5)	−7.8 (18.0)	−12.4 (9.7)	−13.7 (7.3)
Average precipitation mm (inches)	84.9 (3.34)	71.0 (2.80)	64.9 (2.56)	90.5 (3.56)	134.3 (5.29)	98.2 (3.87)	177.5 (6.99)	179.6 (7.07)	140.8 (5.54)	121.3 (4.78)	116.3 (4.58)	109.3 (4.30)	1,383.3 (54.46)
Average snowfall cm (inches)	152 (60)	124 (49)	62 (24)	1 (0.4)	0 (0)	0 (0)	0 (0)	0 (0)	0 (0)	0 (0)	14 (5.5)	91 (36)	442 (174)
Average rainy days	19.1	15.5	12.5	10.8	11.0	9.2	12.2	9.8	10.8	12.9	15.8	18.9	158.5
Average snowy days	18.1	15.2	8.6	0.1	0	0	0	0	0	0	1.9	11.0	54.9
Mean monthly sunshine hours	46.0	64.1	127.0	164.3	166.6	158.9	130.3	157.3	166.6	142.6	75.0	43.4	1,454.5
Source 1: JMA
Source 2: JMA
