= Ishikura Station =

Railway station in Mori, Hokkaido, Japan

Coordinates: 42.1726°N 140.4582°E

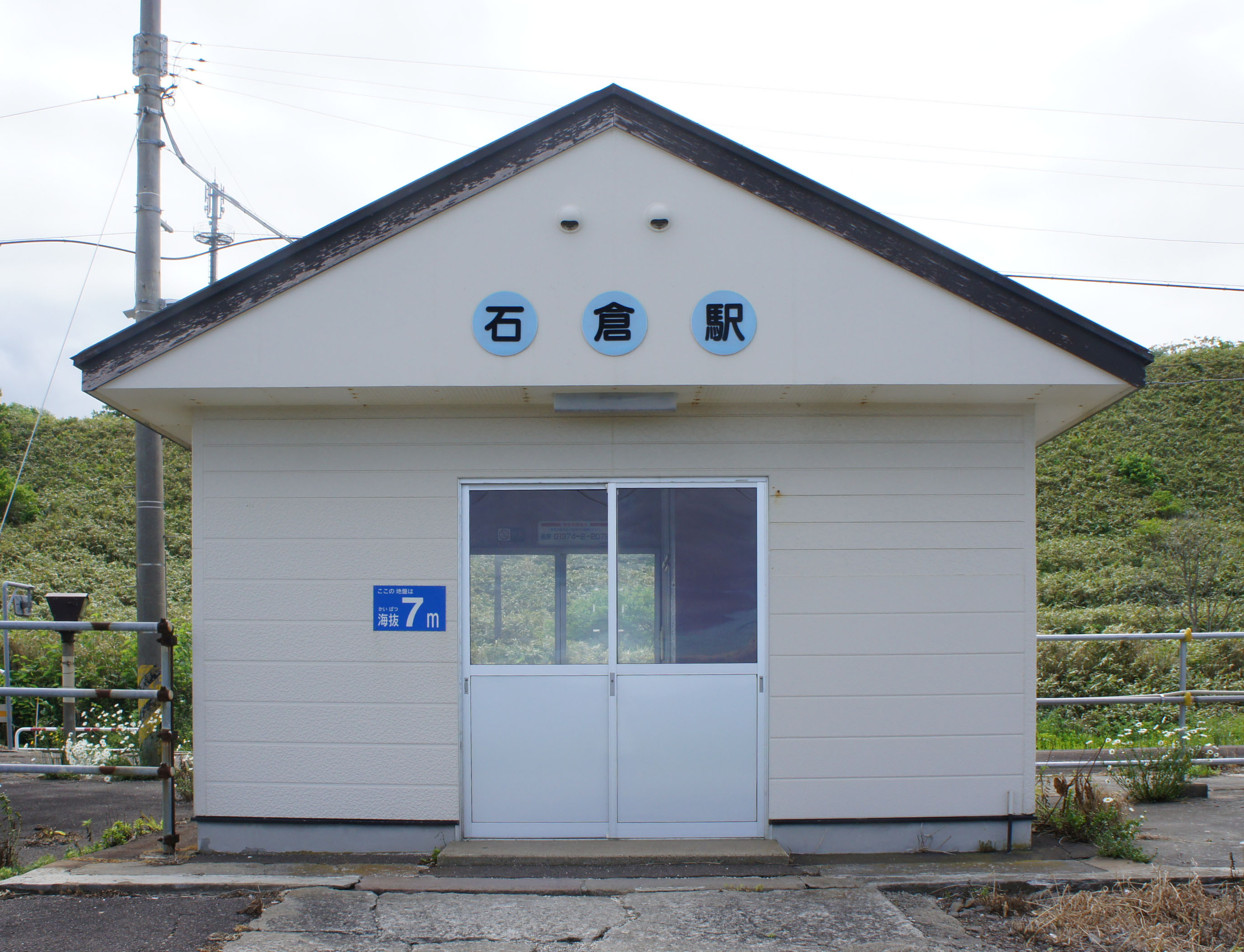
Ishikura Station

Ishikura Station (石倉駅, Ishikura-eki) is a railway station in Mori, Kayabe District, Hokkaidō Prefecture, Japan.

== Lines ==
- Hokkaido Railway Company
  - Hakodate Main Line Station H58

== Adjacent stations ==
«	Service	»
Hakodate Main Line
Mori	Local	Otoshibe
