= Takikawa Museum of Art and Natural History =

- 滝川市美術自然史館
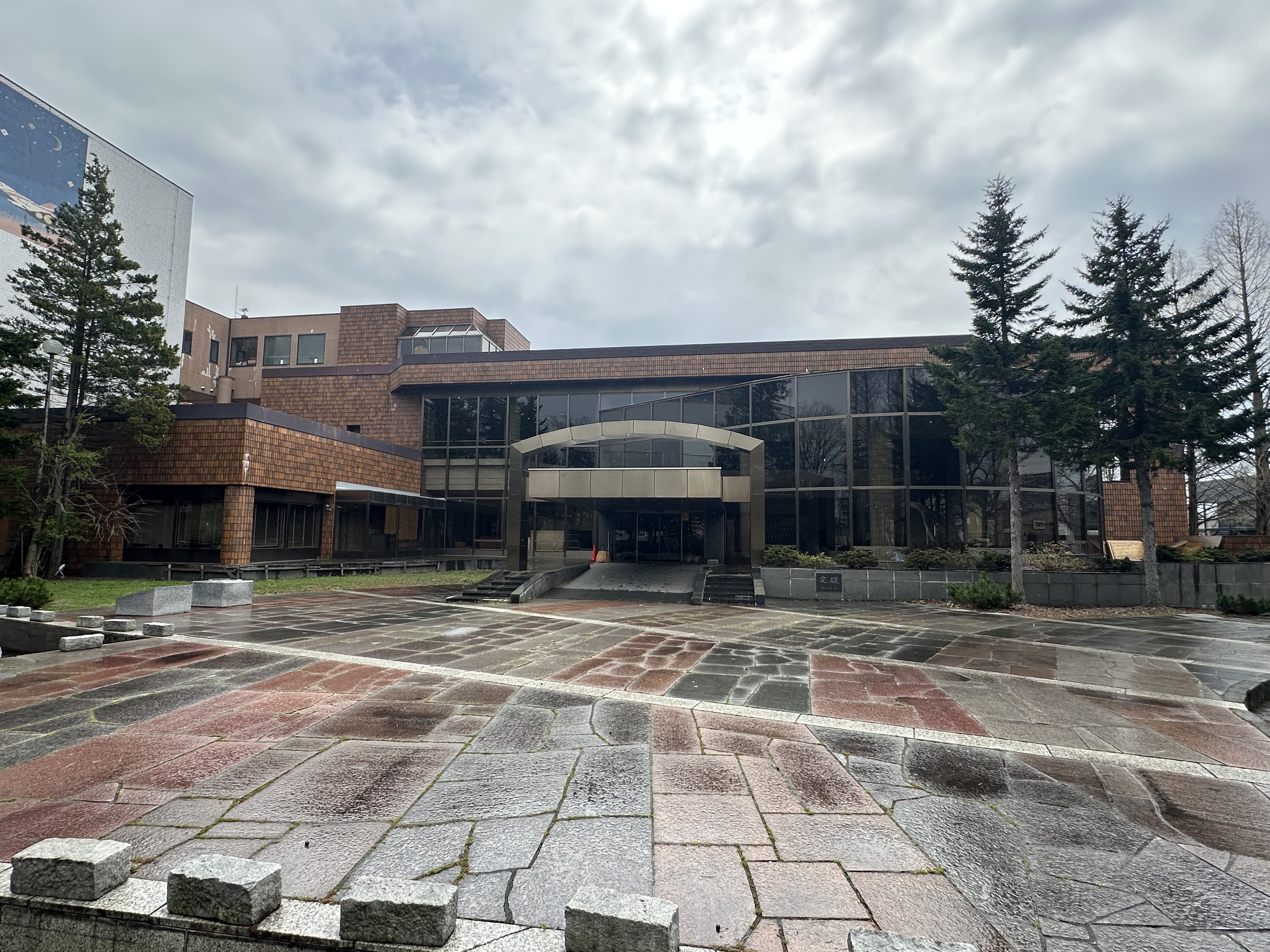
- The front view
- Interactive map of the Takikawa Museum of Art and Natural History area

General information
- Location: 2-5-30 Shinmachi, Takikawa, Hokkaidō, Japan
- Coordinates: 43°33′07″N 141°54′53″E
- Opened: 1986

Website
- Official website

Takikawa Museum of Art and Natural History (滝川市美術自然史館, Takikawa-shi Bijutsu Shizen-shi Kan) opened in Takikawa, Hokkaidō, Japan in 1986. The collection includes works by Iwahashi Eien (岩橋英遠), Ichiki Masumi (一木万寿三), and Ueda Sōkyū (上田桑鳩) as well as the fossil type specimen of the Takikawa sea cow, discovered in the bed of the Sorachi River (空知川) in 1980 and designated a Prefectural Natural Monument.

== See also ==
- List of Natural Monuments of Japan (Hokkaidō)
