= Koboro Station =

Railway station in Toyoura, Hokkaido, Japan

Coordinates: 42°35′23″N 140°32′15″E

H45 Koboro Station 小幌駅
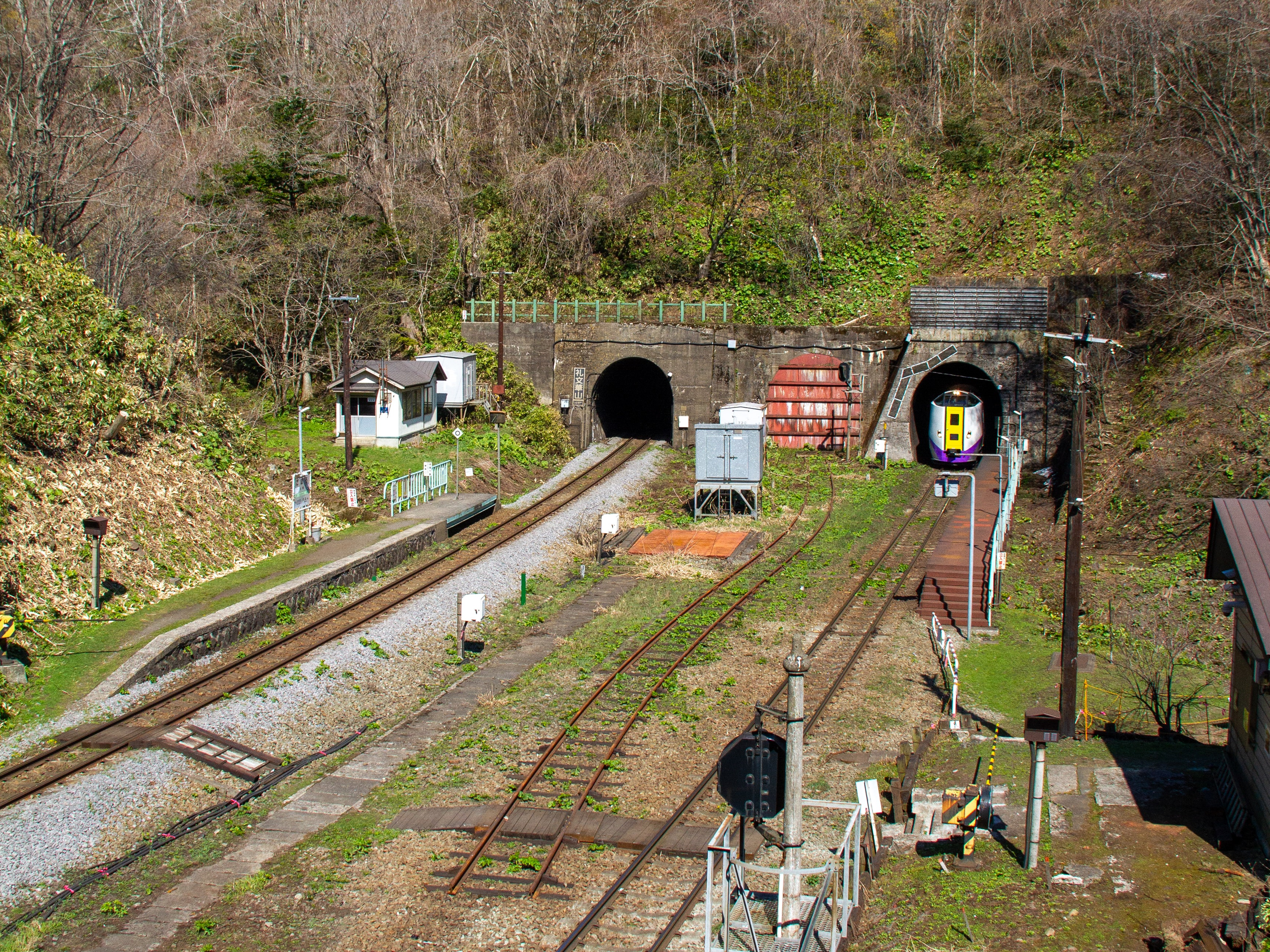
- Full view of the Koboro Station in April 2022

General information
- Location: Rebunka, Toyoura Town, Abuta District; Hokkaido; Japan
- Operator: JR Hokkaido
- Line: Muroran Main Line
- Platforms: 2 side platforms
- Tracks: 2

Construction
- Structure type: At grade

Other information
- Status: Unstaffed
- Station code: H45

History
- Opened: 25 September 1943; 83 years ago

Services
Preceding station	JR Hokkaido	Following station
Shizukari H46 towards Oshamambe	Muroran Main Line	Rebun H44 towards Iwamizawa
Location
- Location within Hokkaido Location within Japan

Koboro Station (小幌駅, Koboro-eki) is a railway station in Toyoura, Hokkaido, Japan, operated by the Hokkaido Railway Company (JR Hokkaido).

Located in an 80-metre (260 ft) gap in between two long tunnels in the cliffs along Uchiura Bay, the station has no road access and is known for being the most secluded station in Japan.

== Lines ==
Koboro Station is served by the Muroran Main Line.

== Station layout ==
The station has two side platforms, serving one track each. There is no station building or waiting room, only a small maintenance shed. An outhouse with a bio-toilet is available.

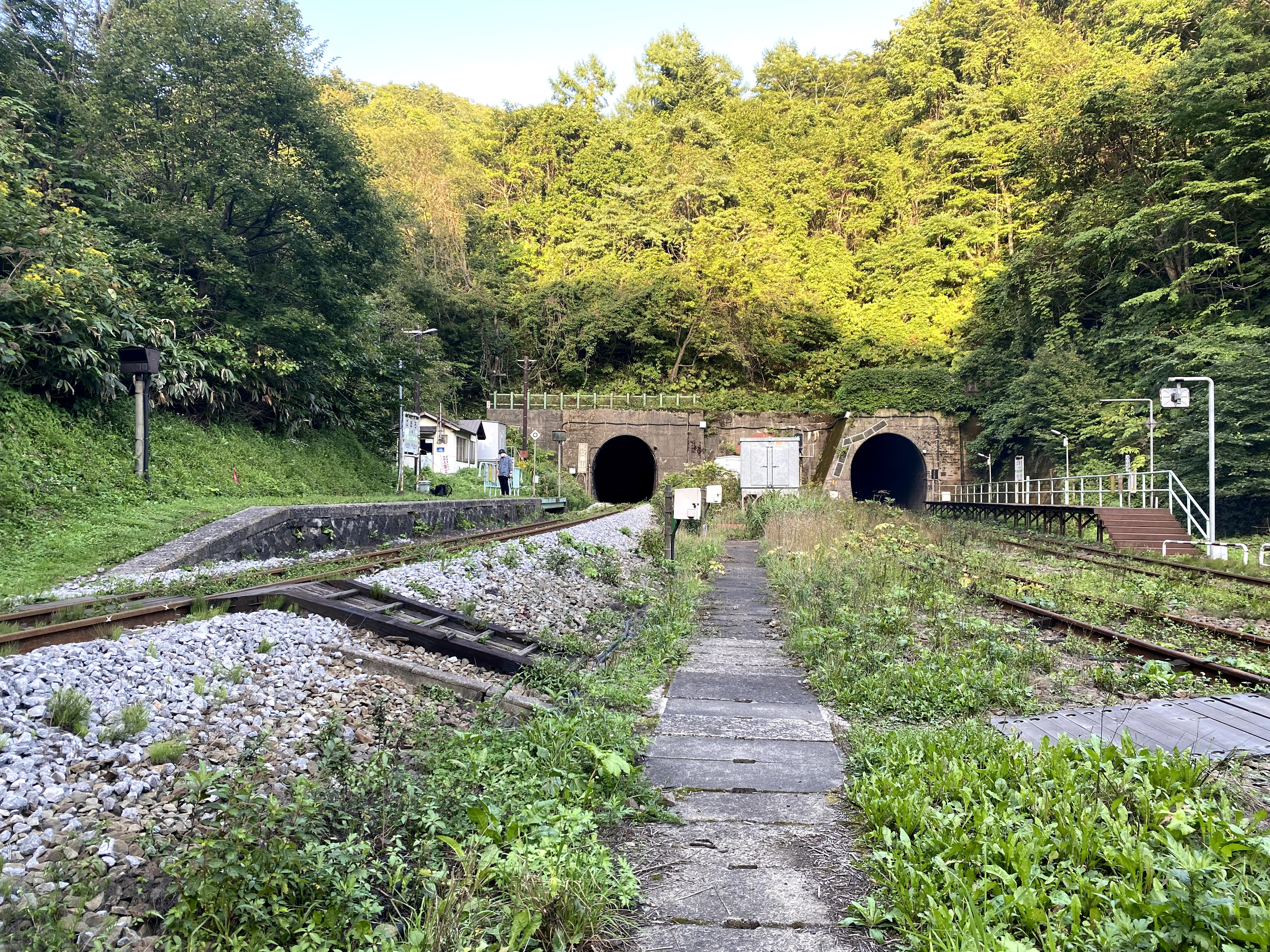
Platform view for Higashi-Muroran

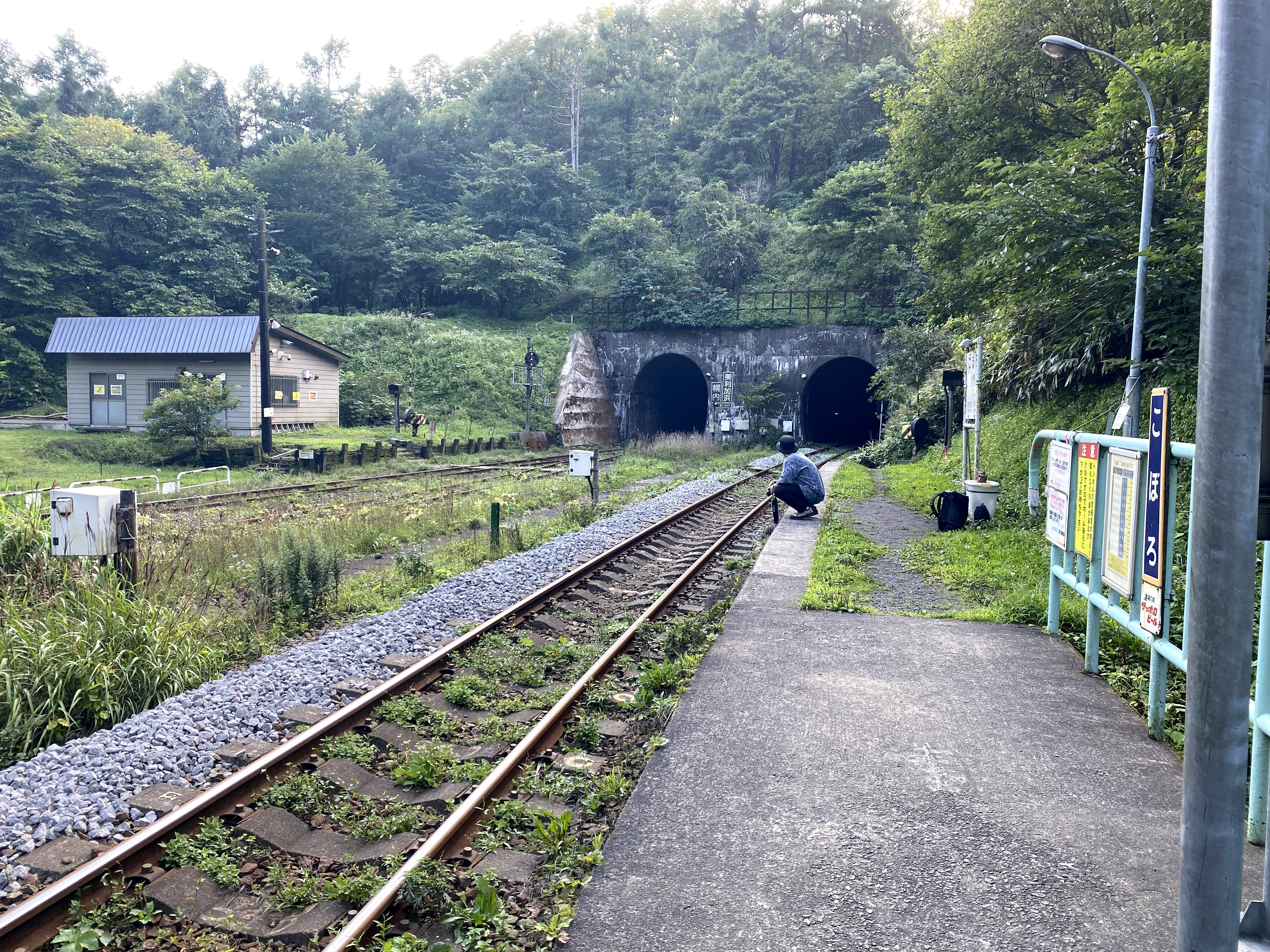
Platform view for Oshamambe

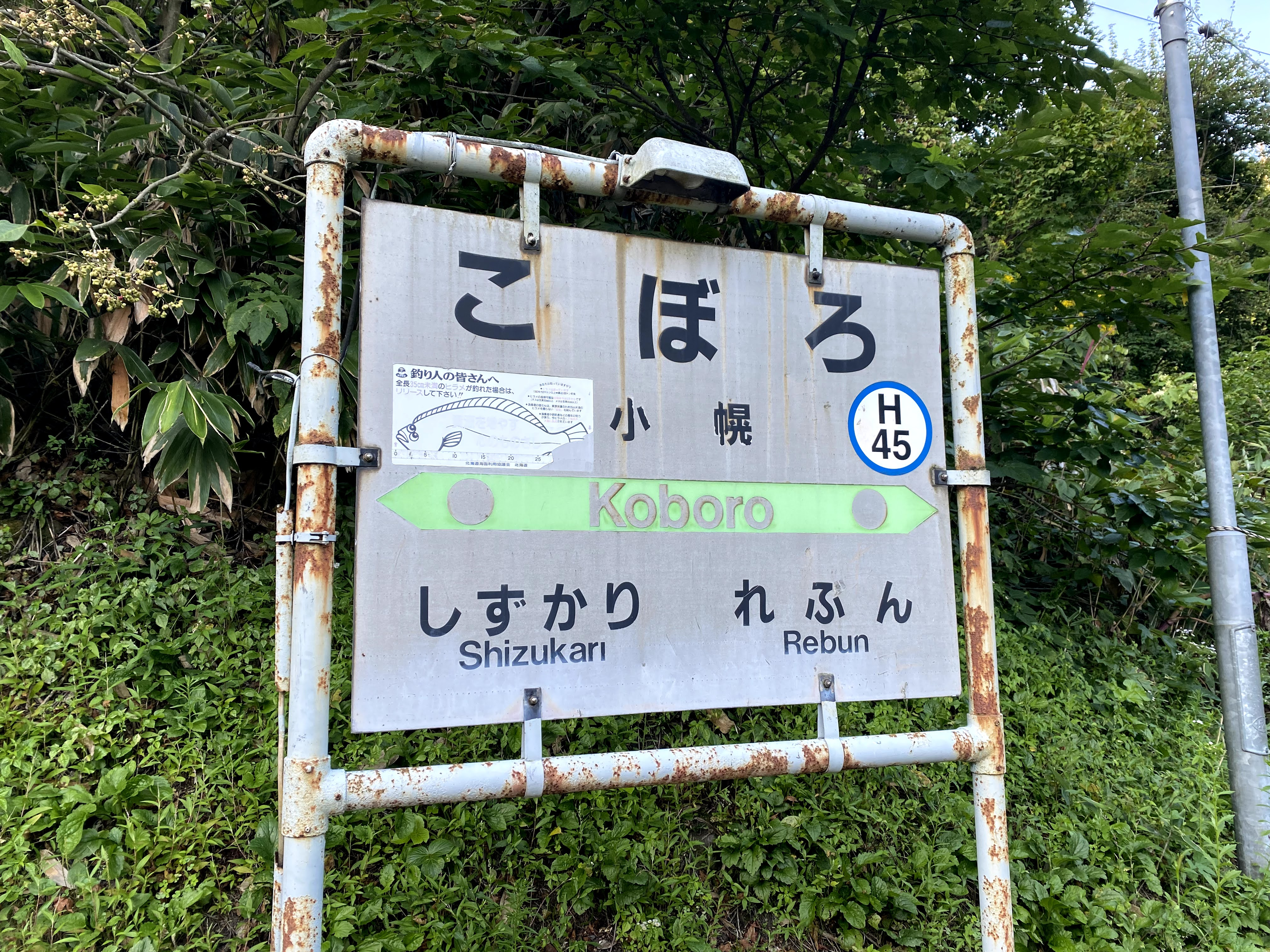
Name sign

== History ==
The station originally opened on September 30, 1943 as Koboro Signal Box (Koboro shingōjō). It added a passing loop to the then-single-track line and served as a point for token exchange, increasing line capacity in order to meet a wartime surge in demand — at the time, the Muroran Line as well as the Hakodate Main Line had been pressed into service to transportation coal and other material for the ongoing Pacific War. Finding a suitable location was difficult, as the track ran through a succession of tunnels in rugged terrain; track duplication was also considered as an alternative. Ultimately, it was constructed on a section with gentler grade as a ″chimney-style signal box″ — an arrangement where stopped trains would remain mostly inside the tunnel, with only the front of the steam locomotive peeking out into the open air to vent smoke. This unusual design was to become a contributing factor in the Muroran Main Line train collision on March 31, 1947.

Despite its classification as a ′signal box′ rather than a 'station', passengers were allowed to board and disembark. Upon conversion of the line to double-track running, the signal box was made redundant and thus reclassified as Koboro Provisional Stop (Koboro kari-jōkōjō) on October 1, 1967. It was promoted to the status of full station and renamed Koboro Station on April 1, 1987 when JR Hokkaido was established. However, the location of the station was not officially defined by the distance for the purpose of fare calculation until March 10, 1990.

In July 2015, JR Hokkaido suggested that the station may be closed due to high maintenance costs and low ridership; it was later announced that this could happen as early as the end of October. However, the local government of Toyoura sought to keep the station open for tourism purposes, and the closure was deferred while they entered into discussions with JR Hokkaido regarding the possibility of subsidizing the maintenance expenses. In December 2015, JR Hokkaido announced that the station would continue to operate in the coming year with financial and manpower support from the town government; the arrangement would be renewed annually after review and consultation with the local authorities. The most recent renewal took place on 28 March 2022.

In January 2016, two railway fans were left stranded at Koboro station when a local train heading for Higashi-Muroran passed through without making its scheduled stop. Due to the station's extreme inaccessibility, JR Hokkaido had to arrange for a Hokuto express train traveling in the opposite direction (towards Hakodate) to make an unscheduled stop about an hour and a half later to pick up the passengers.

== Surrounding area ==
- Koboro Cave Ruins (Iwaya Kanon) geosite, part of Toya-Usu UNESCO Global Geopark
