= Assabu =

Assabu 厚沢部町
- Town
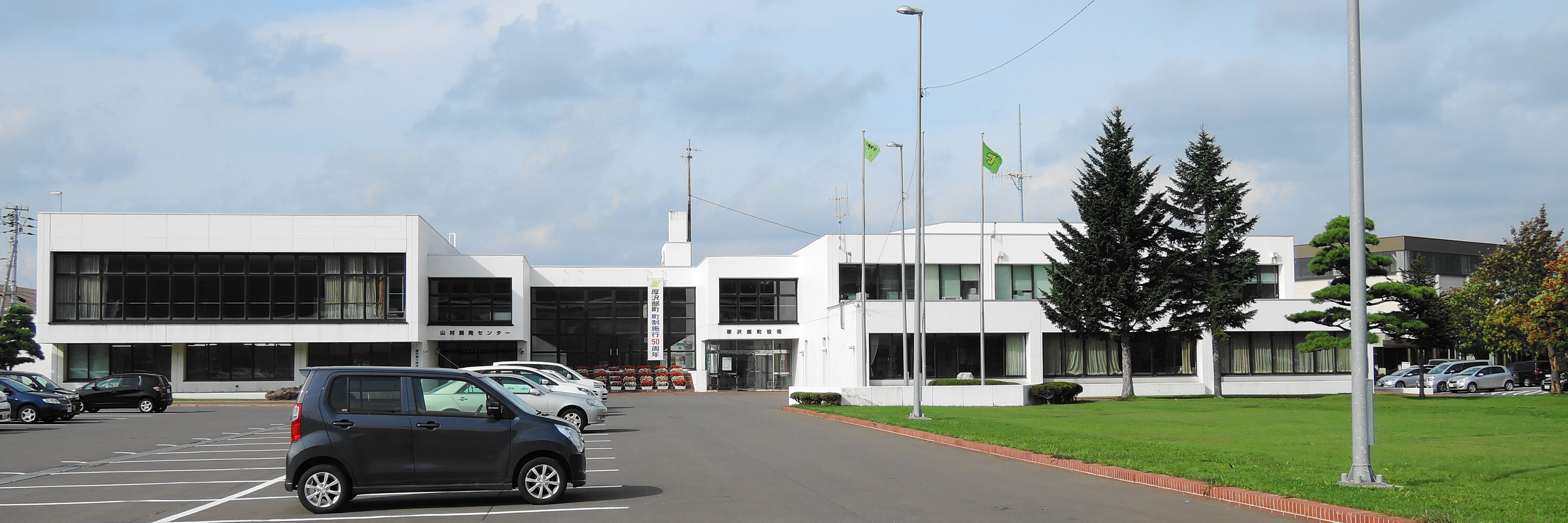
- Assabu Town hall

- Flag Emblem

- Location of Assabu in Hokkaido

- Location in Japan
- Coordinates: 41°55′N 140°14′E
- Country: Japan
- Region: Hokkaido
- Prefecture: Hokkaido
- District: Hiyama

Government
  - Mayor: Masami Shibata

Area
  - Total: 460.58 km^{2} (177.83 sq mi)

Population (October 1, 2020)
  - Total: 3,592
  - Density: 7.799/km^{2} (20.20/sq mi)
- Time zone: UTC+09:00 (JST)
- City hall address: 207 Shinmachi, Assabu-chō, Hiyama-gun, Hokkaidō; 043-1113
- Website: www.town.assabu.lg.jp
- Symbols
- Flower: Azalea (躑躅, Tsutsuji)
- Tree: Japanese Black Pine (クロマツ, Kuromatsu)

Assabu (厚沢部町, Assabu-chō) is a small town located in Hiyama Subprefecture, Hokkaido, Japan. Assabu is situated in the Oshima Peninsula of southern Hokkaido near the Sea of Japan.

== Geography ==
The municipality is landlocked, comprising several valley basins and is encircled by forest-clad hills, opening out towards the Japan sea to the west. Around 20% of the Assabu municipal area is forested, with significant loss in recent years. Species include the Hiba (Japanese Cypress), Goyoumatsu (Japanese White Pine) and Todomatsu (Sakhalin Fir) species.

=== Nearby cities and towns ===
- Esashi to the west
- Hokuto to the northeast
- Kaminokuni to the south
- Kikonai to the south and east
- Otobe to the northwest
- Yakumo to the north

=== Mountains ===
- Mt. Otobe (乙部岳, Otobe-dake) (elevation: 1017 m)
- Mt. Taiko (太鼓山, Taiko-yama) (elevation: 147 m)

=== Rivers ===
There are numerous rivers running through the area, the largest of which is the Assabu River (厚沢部川, Assabu-gawa).

== Industry ==
Agriculture, forestry, dairy farming and the local government are Assabu's main sources of employment. The district's leading crop, the May Queen potato, is sold around Japan and is the town mascot.

Other crops grown in the Assabu area include Daikon (radish), Hikari black soybeans, Dainagon Azuki (red beans) and rice.

A shōchū (white spirit) made from May Queen potatoes is produced in the town. Assabu also makes its own sake, while locally grown grapes are blended in a southern Hokkaido wine. Kuromame-cha is a tea blend brewed using Assabu-grown black beans.

== Local attractions ==
The town has a variety of in and outdoor recreational facilities. There are three local Onsen (Gamushi Onsen in Kamisato, Uzura Onsen and Tate Onsen). Assabu has a public swimming pool (closed in winter) and Park Golf (a combination of golf, mini golf and croquet, invented in Japan). Forest walks are available on local hill Taikoyama (drum mountain) and the Reku-no-mori, Tsuchihashi Nature Observation, and Education Forest, where there are also camping facilities.

The town has its own ski-field, suitable for beginners, which is located on the slopes of Mt. Taiko.

There are several restaurants in Assabu-cho and in the surrounding district. The town centre has three ramen/izakaya restaurants, three sushi-ya restaurants and two karaoke bars. In the local district, Takino has a soba restaurant where noodles are made on the premises while Uzura and Tate each have one eating place.

== Demographics ==
=== Population ===
The population of the Assabu region has declined significantly in recent decades due to agricultural reforms and the migration of local youth to urban areas such as Sapporo. Public facilities in some areas have been scaled back as a result, including schools. Assabu has adopted the slogan "The World's Loveliest Depopulated Town" (世界一素敵な過疎のまち).

Historical population
Year	Pop.	±%
1970	8,039	—
1980	6,862	−14.6%
1990	5,755	−16.1%
2000	5,105	−11.3%
2010	4,414	−13.5%
2020	3,592	−18.6%

=== Municipalities ===
As well as the Assabu township itself, which is made up of four areas (Hon-chō 本町, Midori-machi 緑町, Shin-machi 新町, and Akanuma (赤沼)), the municipal area includes several smaller hamlets, including:

- Asahioka (朝丘)
- Iwami
- Kimanai (木間内)
- Kaminoyama (上の山)
- Kamisato (上里)
- Miwa (美和)
- Shimizu (清水)
- Tate (館)
- Togeshita (峠下)
- Takino (滝野)
- Tomiei
- Uzura (鶉)

== Education ==
Due to the rapidly decreasing population, schools in Assabu have been decreasing rapidly. In 2018, two Junior High Schools, Tate Junior High School (館中学校) and Uzura Junior High School (鶉中学校) were closed, consolidating all Junior High School students in the district into one school. In April 2019, the three nursery schools, Assabu Nursery School (厚沢部保育園), Tate Nursery School (館保育園), and Uzura Nursery School (鶉保育園), were consolidated into a singular Certified Kindergarten (認定こども園)

The town does not have a high school. Many students attend high school in nearby Esashi or live in residential facilities while attending high schools in Hakodate.

=== Junior high school ===
- Assabu Junior High School (厚沢部町立厚沢部中学校)

=== Elementary schools ===
- Assabu Elementary School (厚沢部小学校)
- Tate Elementary School (館小学校)
- Uzura Elementary School (鶉小学校)

=== Kindergartens ===
- Hazeru Certified Kindergarten (認定こども園はぜる)

== History ==
Assabu dates back to the days of the Matsumae clan feudal clan who gained control over Hokkaido's Oshima Peninsula during the Sengoku period and first settled the town area in 1678. Offering an opening in the mountains accessible from the sea, Assabu was established as a forestry camp. As the area was cleared, agriculture followed and farmers began reclamation of land from the swampy drainage basin of local rivers.

Like much of the Oshima Peninsula, armed merchants were in the vanguard of local settlers, and one of the mansion-castles typical of the period was established in the area near Tate - Tate castle (館城, Tate-jo)

In 1869, Assabu briefly fell under the control of shogunate loyalists during the occupation of Hokkaido by forces loyal to the Tokugawa family led by general Enomoto Takeaki. It was returned to the control of the Matsumae feudal clan in the same year after the rebellion in Hokkaido was quashed by the new Meiji Emperor. During this conflict, Tate castle was assaulted by Meiji forces and destroyed.

In 1871, the Matsumae clan's control over their march territories in Hokkaido was dissolved and in 1872, Hokkaido was designated for colonisation and the area administered by the colonial office. In 1906, two village districts in the area were merged, receiving the official designation of Assabu-chou.

The Assabu Yakuba (town council organization) rejected a merger proposal with the neighbouring Esashi municipality in 2005. Esashi is thought to be financially less well off than Assabu.

At the end of July 2006, Assabu townsfolk cooked what was locally called the world's largest potato croquette. Measuring 2.1 meters in diameter and 320 kilograms in weight the behemoth emerged from 180 kilograms of potatoes, and vast quantities of fried minced meat and onions covered with wheat flour and eggs. A crane was used to dip the mix into a vat containing 252 litres of cooking oil. Cooking time was just eight minutes. The croquette was divided into 1,300 servings at a local festival. Every year, a similar-sized potato croquette is made at the local festival held at the end of July.

== Transportation ==
Assabu is an hour's drive by car from Hakodate and 15 minutes from Esashi. Other transport links include a road from Yakumo on the east coast and a bus to Esashi. The bus to Shin-Hakodate Hokuto Station, the northern terminal of the Hokkaido Shinkansen, takes around 50 minutes. The drive to Sapporo, Hokkaido's largest city, takes four and a half hours on the toll expressway and six hours on toll-free highways.
