= Oshamambe, Hokkaido =

Oshamambe 長万部町
- Town
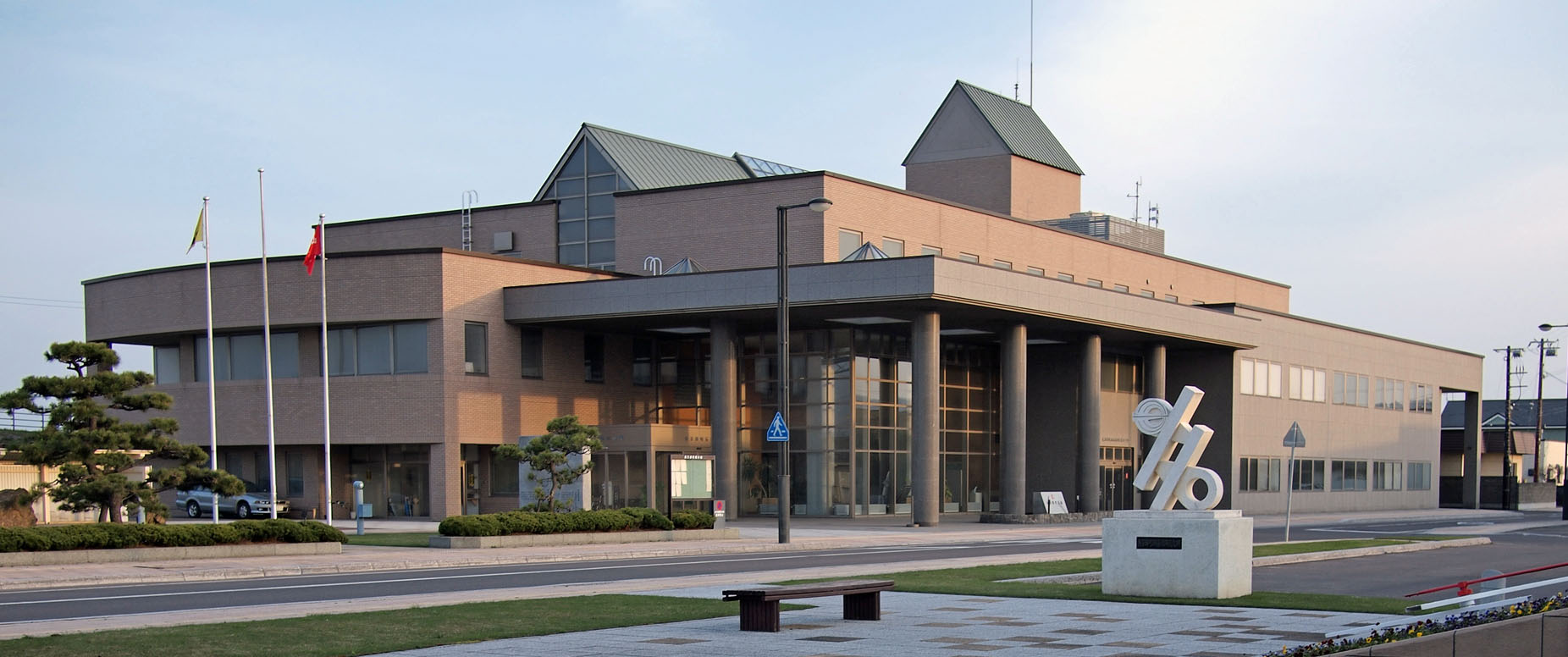
- Oshamanbe Town Hall

- Flag Seal

- Location of Oshamambe in Hokkaido (Oshima Subprefecture)

- Location in Japan
- Coordinates: 42°30′29″N 140°22′23″E
- Country: Japan
- Region: Hokkaido
- Prefecture: Hokkaido (Oshima Subprefecture)
- District: Yamakoshi

Government
  - Mayor: Masashi Kihata

Area
  - Total: 310.75 km^{2} (119.98 sq mi)

Population (30 September 2016)
  - Total: 5,694
  - Density: 18.32/km^{2} (47.46/sq mi)
- Time zone: UTC+09:00 (JST)
- City hall address: 453-1 Oshamambe, Oshamambe, Yamakoshi District, Hokkaido; 049-3592
- Climate: Dfb
- Website: www.town.oshamambe.lg.jp
- Symbols
- Flower: Iris sanguinea
- Tree: Pinus thunbergii

Oshamambe (長万部町, Oshamanbe-chō) is a town located in Oshima Subprefecture, Hokkaido, Japan.

As of 30 October 2016, the town has an estimated population of 5,694. The total land area is 310.75 km^{2}.

== Geography ==
Oshamambe faces Uchiura Bay, which is a bay of the Pacific Ocean.

=== Neighboring municipalities ===
- Hiyama Subprefecture
  - Imakane
- Iburi Subprefecture
  - Toyoura
- Oshima Subprefecture
  - Yakumo
- Shiribeshi Subprefecture
  - Kuromatsunai
  - Shimamaki

=== Climate ===
Climate data for Oshamambe, Hokkaido (1991−2020 normals, extremes 1977−present)
Month	Jan	Feb	Mar	Apr	May	Jun	Jul	Aug	Sep	Oct	Nov	Dec	Year
Record high °C (°F)	8.1 (46.6)	9.1 (48.4)	16.0 (60.8)	23.8 (74.8)	29.3 (84.7)	29.9 (85.8)	32.6 (90.7)	32.0 (89.6)	30.8 (87.4)	25.4 (77.7)	20.4 (68.7)	13.3 (55.9)	32.6 (90.7)
Mean daily maximum °C (°F)	−0.2 (31.6)	0.4 (32.7)	4.0 (39.2)	9.9 (49.8)	14.9 (58.8)	18.3 (64.9)	22.1 (71.8)	24.2 (75.6)	22.0 (71.6)	16.1 (61.0)	8.7 (47.7)	2.0 (35.6)	11.9 (53.4)
Daily mean °C (°F)	−4.1 (24.6)	−3.6 (25.5)	0.0 (32.0)	5.2 (41.4)	10.2 (50.4)	14.5 (58.1)	18.7 (65.7)	20.6 (69.1)	17.2 (63.0)	10.7 (51.3)	4.1 (39.4)	−1.9 (28.6)	7.6 (45.8)
Mean daily minimum °C (°F)	−8.7 (16.3)	−8.6 (16.5)	−4.6 (23.7)	0.3 (32.5)	5.6 (42.1)	11.1 (52.0)	15.9 (60.6)	17.4 (63.3)	12.6 (54.7)	5.4 (41.7)	−0.5 (31.1)	−6.1 (21.0)	3.3 (38.0)
Record low °C (°F)	−20.5 (−4.9)	−20.4 (−4.7)	−16.6 (2.1)	−9.7 (14.5)	−2.1 (28.2)	2.7 (36.9)	5.2 (41.4)	7.4 (45.3)	2.2 (36.0)	−3.0 (26.6)	−10.4 (13.3)	−18.9 (−2.0)	−20.5 (−4.9)
Average precipitation mm (inches)	73.2 (2.88)	73.3 (2.89)	64.3 (2.53)	82.2 (3.24)	104.7 (4.12)	98.4 (3.87)	148.1 (5.83)	176.2 (6.94)	164.5 (6.48)	114.6 (4.51)	108.0 (4.25)	88.8 (3.50)	1,296.1 (51.03)
Average snowfall cm (inches)	174 (69)	164 (65)	104 (41)	9 (3.5)	0 (0)	0 (0)	0 (0)	0 (0)	0 (0)	0 (0)	24 (9.4)	128 (50)	600 (236)
Average rainy days	16.9	16.0	13.6	11.0	10.2	9.5	11.1	11.3	11.6	13.2	15.3	16.5	156.2
Average snowy days	21.6	20.4	15.0	1.4	0	0	0	0	0	0	3.0	15.7	77.1
Mean monthly sunshine hours	98.0	95.7	141.6	174.3	179.8	135.2	113.5	131.9	156.8	151.2	106.0	94.5	1,578.5
Source 1: JMA
Source 2: JMA

== History ==
- 1864: The village of Oshamambe was founded.
- 1906: Oshamambe became a Second Class Village.
- 1923: Oshamambe became a First Class Village.
- 1943: Oshamambe village became Oshamambe town.

== Education ==
=== University ===
- Tokyo University of Science, Oshamambe Campus
- Oshamambe Town Board of Education
  - High school
    - Hokkaido Oshamambe High School
  - Junior high school
    - Oshamambe Junior High School
  - Elementary schools
    - Oshamambe Elementary School
    - Shizukari Elementary School

== Transportation ==
=== Railway ===
Setana Line ran from Kunnui Station. There used to be Asahihama station between Oshamambe Station and Shizukari Station.

- Hakodate Main Line: Kita-Toyotsu - Kunnui - Oshamambe - Futamata
- Muroran Main Line: Oshamambe - Shizukari

=== Highway ===
- Hokkaido Expressway: Shizukari PA - Oshamambe IC - Kunnui IC
- National Route 5
- National Route 37
- National Route 230

Plans are in place to build a station at Oshamambe and construction is underway on the Hokkaido Shinkansen line. The section between Hakodate and Sapporo should be completed by 2030.
