= Otobe, Hokkaido =

Otobe 乙部町
- Town
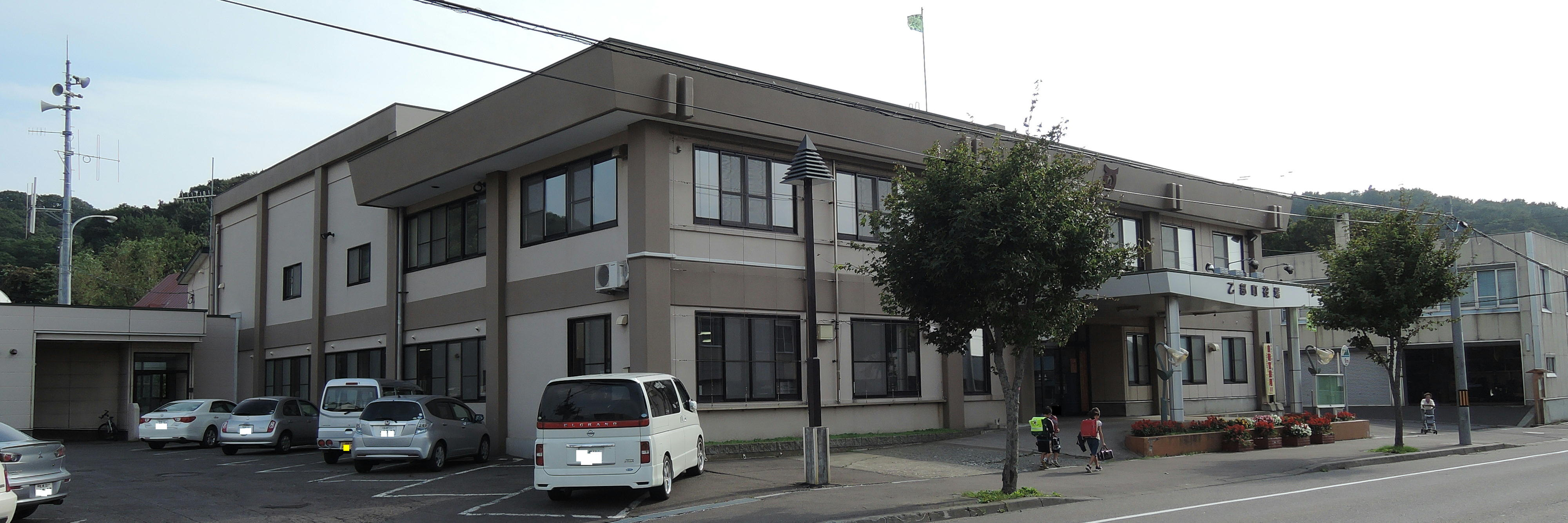
- Otobe Town hall

- Flag Seal

- Location of Otobe in Hokkaido (Hiyama Subprefecture)

- Location in Japan
- Coordinates: 41°58′N 140°8′E
- Country: Japan
- Region: Hokkaido
- Prefecture: Hokkaido (Hiyama Subprefecture)
- District: Nishi

Government
  - Mayor: Tsutomu Terashima

Area
  - Total: 162.55 km^{2} (62.76 sq mi)

Population (September 30, 2016)
  - Total: 3,925
  - Density: 24.15/km^{2} (62.54/sq mi)
- Time zone: UTC+09:00 (JST)
- City hall address: 388 Midoricho, Otobe, Nishi District, Hokkaido; 043-0103
- Website: www.town.otobe.lg.jp
- Symbols
- Flower: Lilium
- Tree: Cryptomeria

Otobe (乙部町, Otobe-chō) is a town located in Hiyama Subprefecture, Hokkaido, Japan.

As of September 2016, the town has an estimated population of 3,925, and a density of 24 persons per km^{2}. The total area is 162.55 km^{2}.

== Geography ==
Otobe is located on the western of the Oshima Peninsula and faces the Sea of Japan.

The name came from Ainu word that means "The river with a marsh in its estuary". This river is Hime River, which flows through the town.

=== Neighboring towns ===
- Hiyama Subprefecture
  - Assabu
  - Esashi
- Oshima Subprefecture
  - Yakumo

== History ==
- 1902: Otobe became a Second Class Village.
- 1965: Otobe Village became Otobe Town.

== Education ==
- Junior high school
  - Otobe Junior High School
- Elementary schools
  - Meiwa Elementary School
  - Otobe Elementary School
  - Sakaehama Elementary School
