= Mikasa, Hokkaido =

Mikasa 三笠市
- City
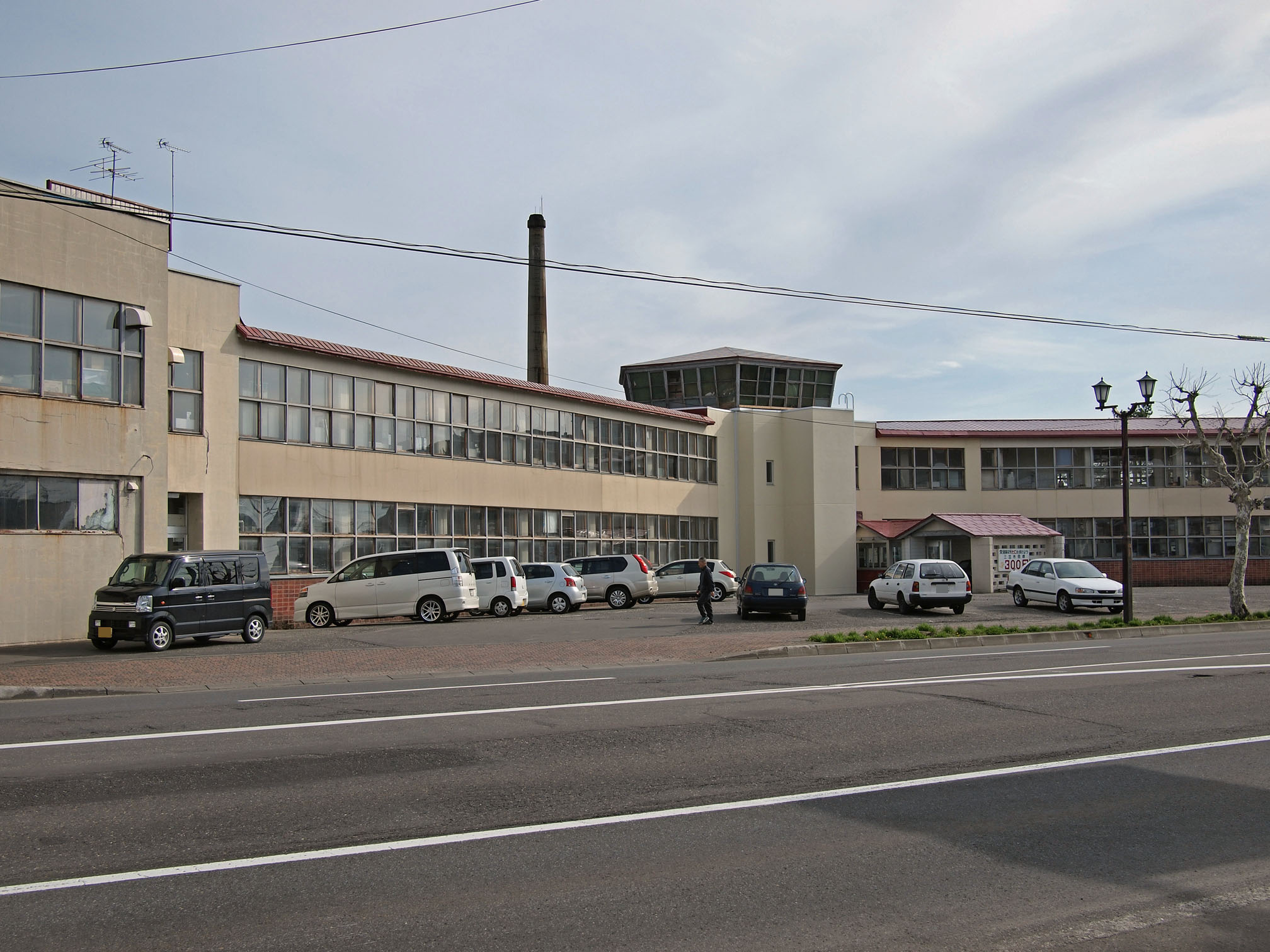
- Mikasa City Hall

- Flag Seal

- Location of Mikasa in Hokkaido (Sorachi Subprefecture)

- Location in Japan
- Coordinates: 43°15′N 141°53′E
- Country: Japan
- Region: Hokkaido
- Prefecture: Hokkaido (Sorachi Subprefecture)

Government
  - Mayor: Kazuo Kobayashi

Area
  - Total: 302.64 km^{2} (116.85 sq mi)

Population (October 1, 2020)
  - Total: 8,040
  - Density: 26.6/km^{2} (68.8/sq mi)
- Time zone: UTC+9 (Japan Standard Time)
- Symbols
  - Tree: Japanese rowan
  - Flower: Chrysanthemum
  - Bird: White wagtail
- Phone number: 01267-2-3182
- Address: 2 Saiwaichō, Mikasa-shi, Hokkaidō; 068-2192
- Website: http://www.city.mikasa.hokkaido.jp/

Mikasa (三笠市, Mikasa-shi) is a city located in Sorachi Subprefecture, Hokkaido, Japan. As of 1 October 2020, the city has an estimated population of 8,040, and the density of 27 persons per km^{2}.

== Geography ==
The total area is 302.64 km^{2}. It is bordered on three sides by mountains, and on its east side is the man-made Lake Katsurazawa.

== History ==
Mikasa is one of the birthplaces of the mining and railroad industries in Hokkaido, and the Hokkai Bon song was invented there. Though in the past it flourished due to its natural abundance of coal, the mines have largely closed down and this has caused the population of the city to fall rapidly.

Quite a few fossil specimens have also been collected there, particularly ammonites and the prehistoric marine reptile Yezosaurus mikasaensis, both of which can be viewed at the city's natural history museum.

- 1906 - Mikasayama village was founded.
- 1942 - Mikasayama village became Mikasa town.
- 1957 - Mikasa town became Mikasa city.

== Education ==
=== High school ===
- Hokkaido Mikasa High School

== Transportation ==
Dō-Ō Expressway runs through west of the city, connecting the city to Asahikawa and Sapporo via Mikasa IC. There are no rail services in the city.

== Agriculture ==
Notable local products include watermelon, musk melon, cucumber, northern plum, and wine.

== Culture ==
=== Mascot ===
Mikasa's mascot is Ryuu-chan (りゅうちゃん, Ryū-chan). He is a 84,000,000-year-old yellow dinosaur.

== Personalities ==
- Tadashi Kawamata (b. 1953), artist

== See also ==
- Mikasa City Museum
