= Yamakoshi District, Hokkaido =

District in Hokkaido, Japan

Coordinates: 42°31′41″N 140°19′23″E

Yamakoshi District in Oshima Subprefecture

Yamakoshi (山越郡, Yamakoshi-gun) is a district located in Oshima Subprefecture, Hokkaido, Japan.

As of 2004, the district has an estimated population of 7,424 and a density of 23.89 persons per km^{2}. The total area is 310.75 km^{2}.

== Towns ==
- Oshamanbe

== Merger ==
- On October 1, 2005, the town of Yakumo (from Yamakoshi District) absorbed the town of Kumaishi (from Nishi District, Hiyama Subprefecture) to create the new and expanded town of Yakumo (now in the newly created Futami District). The former town of Kumaishi joined Oshima Subprefecture at the same time.
