= Futami District, Hokkaido =

District in Hokkaido, Japan

Coordinates: 42°15′N 140°16′E

Futami District in Oshima Subprefecture

Futami (二海郡, Futami-gun) is a district located in Oshima Subprefecture, Hokkaido, Japan.

As of 2004, the district has an estimated population of 16,975 and a density of 23.08 persons per km^{2}. The total area is 735.60 km^{2}.

== Towns ==
- Yakumo

== History ==
The name of "Futami" derives from that the district faces two seas, the Sea of Japan and Uchiura Bay, which is a bay of the Pacific Ocean. Yakumo is the only municipality facing both the Sea of Japan and the Pacific Ocean.

- On October 1, 2005, the old town of Yakumo (from Yamakoshi District, Oshima Subprefecture) merged with the town of Kumaishi (from Nishi District, Hiyama Subprefecture) to create the new and expanded town of Yakumo. The former town of Kumaishi joined Oshima Subprefecture at the same time.
