= Ino Station =

Ino Station is the name of six train stations in Japan:

- Ino Station (Chiba) (井野駅)
- Ino Station (Gunma) (井野駅)
- Ino Station (JR Shikoku) (伊野駅)
- Ino Station (Tosa Electric Railway) (伊野駅)
- Inō Station (Hokkaidō) (伊納駅)
- Inō Station (Yamaguchi) (居能駅)
