= Himekawa Station =

Himekawa Station is the name of two train stations in Japan:

- Himekawa Station (Hokkaido), a railway station in Mori
- Himekawa Station (Niigata), a railway station in Itoigawa
