= Inō Station (Hokkaido) =

Railway station in Asahikawa, Hokkaido, Japan

Coordinates: 43.7627°N 142.272°E

Inō Station 伊納駅
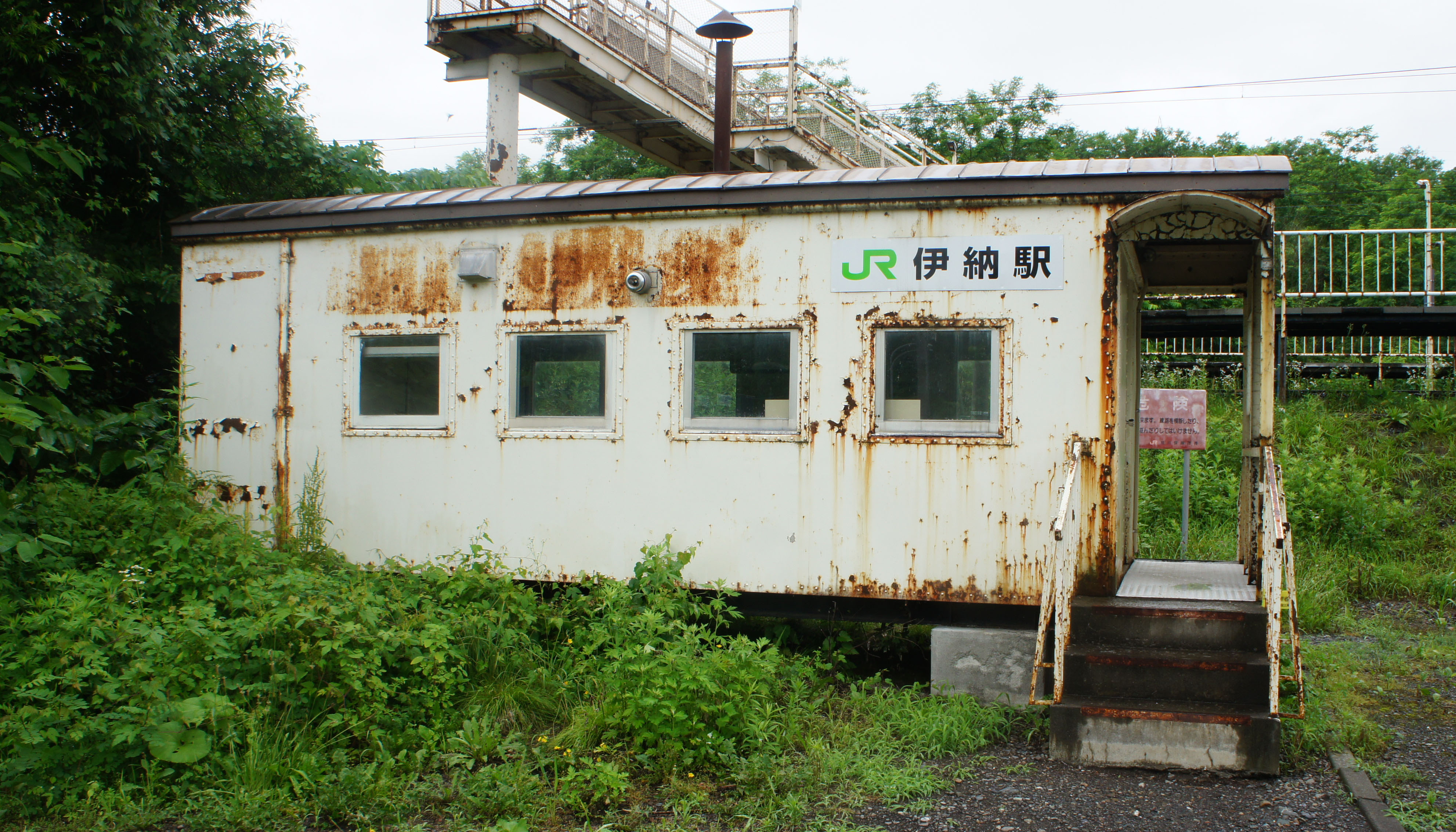
- Hakodate Main-Line Ino Station

General information
- Location: Hokkaido; Japan
- Operator: Hokkaido Railway Company
- Line: Hakodate Main Line
- Platforms: Side platform

Other information
- Station code: A26

History
- Opened: 1898
- Closed: 12 March 2021
Location
- Location within Hokkaido Location within Japan

Inō Station (伊納駅, Inō-eki) was a railway station in Asahikawa, Hokkaidō, Japan, operated by Hokkaido Railway Company (JR Hokkaido).

== Lines ==
Inō Station is served by the Hakodate Main Line, and is numbered A26.

== Adjacent stations ==
«	Service	»
Hakodate Main Line
Limited Express Sōya: Does not stop at this station
Limited Express Okhotsk: Does not stop at this station
Osamunai	Local	Chikabumi
