= Nakanosawa Station =

Railway station in Oshamambe, Hokkaido, Japan

Nakanosawa Station 中ノ沢駅
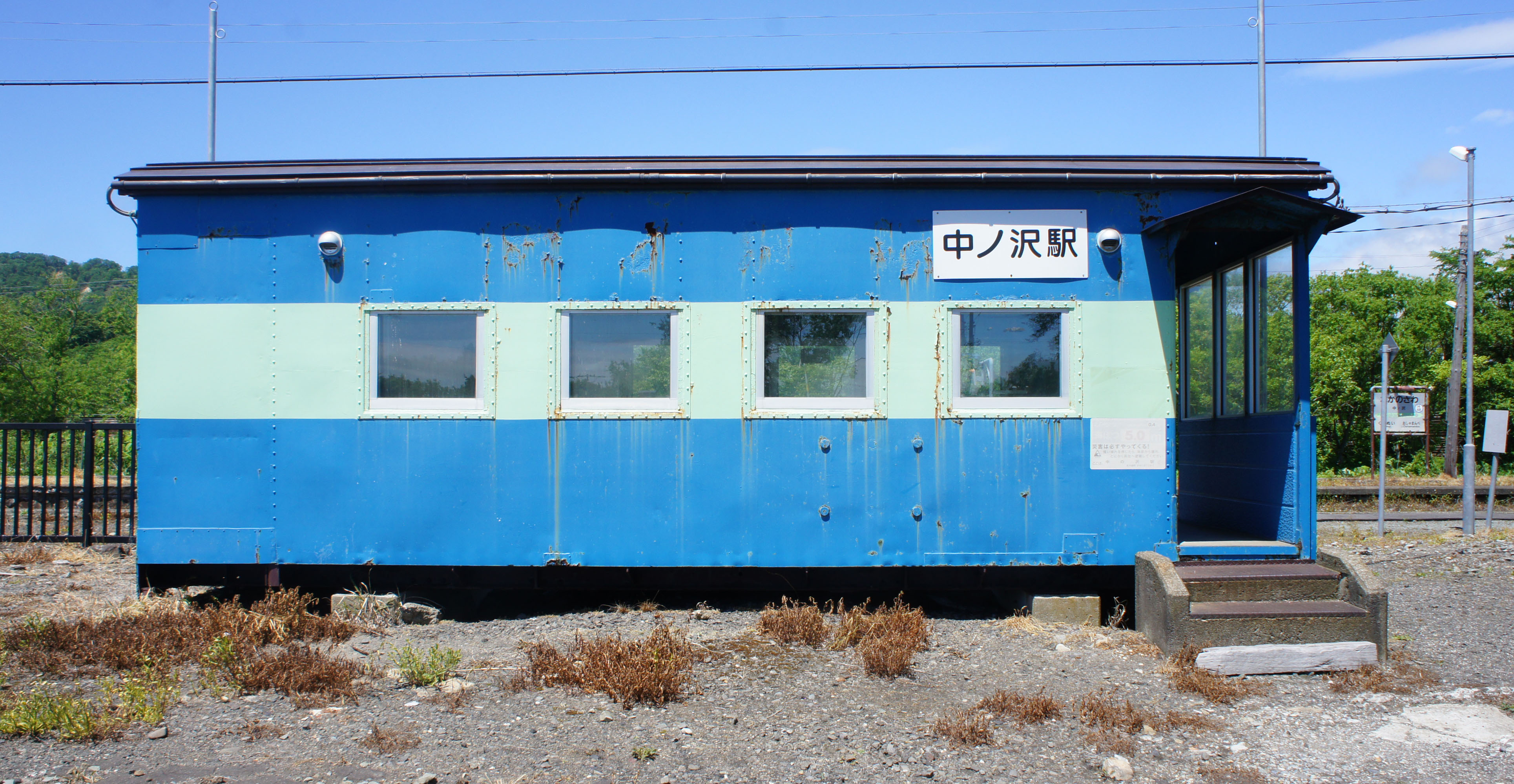
- Station building converted from a former freight car

General information
- Location: Aza Nakanosawa, Oshamambe, Yamakoshi, Hokkaido （北海道山越郡長万部町字中ノ沢） Japan
- Coordinates: 42°28′40.49″N 140°20′45.97″E
- Operator: Hokkaido Railway Company
- Line: Hakodate Main Line
- Connections: Bus stop

Other information
- Station code: H48

History
- Opened: 1904
- Closed: 16 March 2024
Location

Nakanosawa Station (中ノ沢駅, Nakanosawa-eki) was a railway station in Oshamambe, Hokkaidō, Japan, operated by the Hokkaido Railway Company (JR Hokkaido).

== Lines ==
- Hakodate Main Line Station H48

== Surroundings ==
- Route 5
- Hakodate Bus "Nakanosawa Eki-mae" Bus Stop

== History ==
In June 2023, this station was selected to be among 42 stations on the JR Hokkaido network to be slated for abolition owing to low ridership. The last train served the station on 15 March 2024 and the station was officially closed the next day.

== Adjacent stations ==
«	Service	»
Hakodate Main Line
Kunnui	Local	Oshamanbe
