= Yamazaki Station =

Yamazaki Station may refer to:

- Yamazaki Station (Aichi), on the Meitetsu Bisai Line in Inazawa, Aichi, Japan
- Yamazaki Station (Kyoto), on the JR Kyoto Line (Tōkaidō Main Line) in Ōyamazaki, Kyoto, Japan

== See also ==
- Yamasaki Station, the Hakodate Main Line in Yakumo, Hokkaido, Japan
- Mino-Yamazaki Station, on the Yoro Railway Yoro Line in Nannocho, Kaizu, Gifu, Japan
