= Minami-Otaru Station =

Railway station in Otaru, Hokkaido, Japan

Coordinates: 43°11′13.5″N 141°0′27.8″E

S14 Minami-Otaru Station 南小樽駅
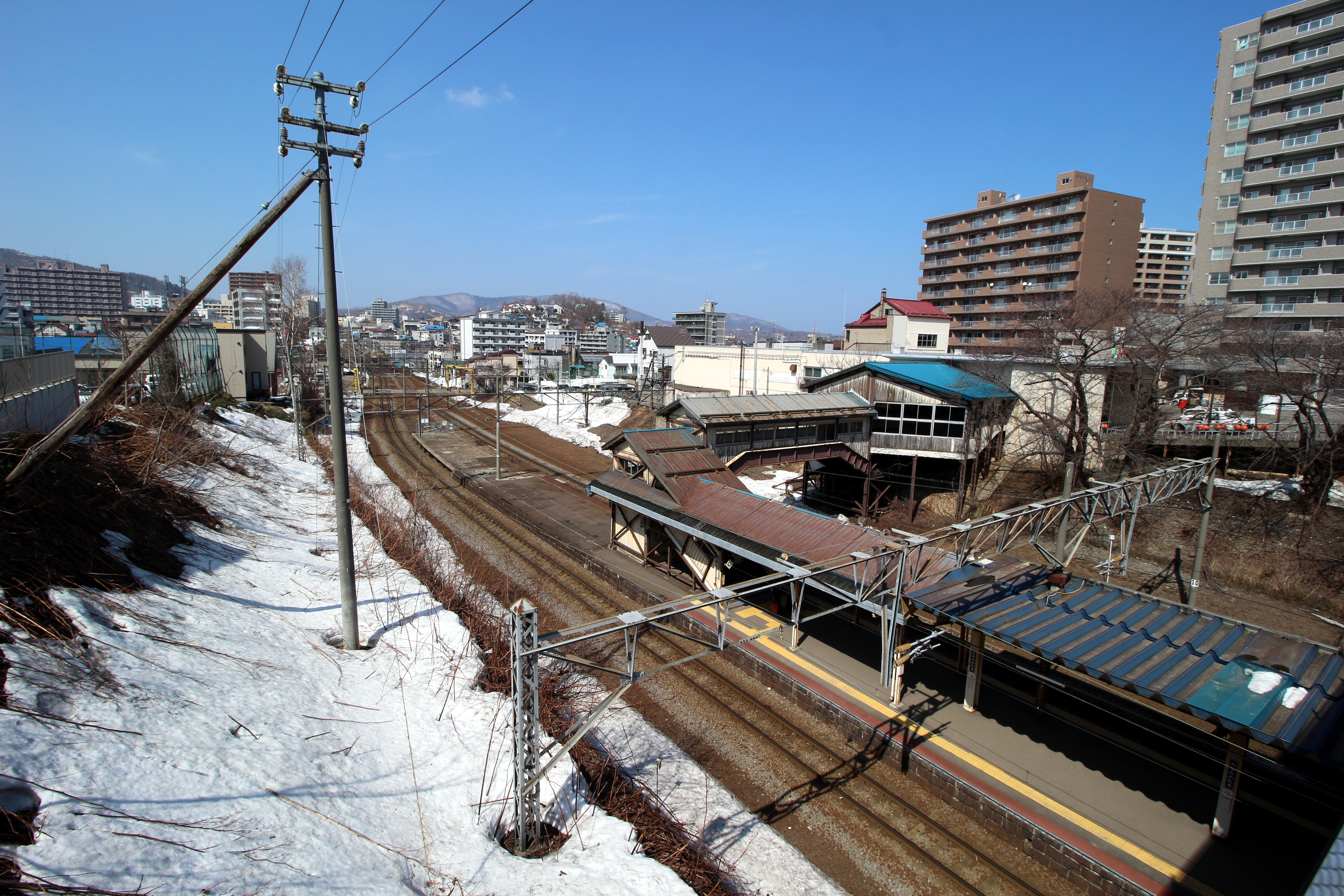
- Station and platforms in 2018

General information
- Location: Otaru, Hokkaido; Japan
- Operator: JR Hokkaido
- Line: ■ Hakodate Main Line
- Distance: 254.1 km from Hakodate
- Platforms: 1 island platform
- Tracks: 2

Other information
- Status: Staffed
- Station code: S14

History
- Opened: November 28, 1880
- Former names: Kaiunchō; Sumiyoshi Station; Otaru (until 1920)

Passengers
- FY2014: 1,778 daily

Services
Preceding station	JR Hokkaido	Following station
Otaru S15 towards Hakodate	Hakodate Main Line Local	Otaru-Chikkō S13 towards Asahikawa
Otaru S15 Terminus	Special Rapid Airport	Otaru-Chikkō S13 towards New Chitose Airport
Otaru S15 Terminus	Rapid Airport	Otaru-Chikkō S13 towards New Chitose Airport
Otaru S15 towards Kutchan	Niseko Liner	Otaru-Chikkō S13 towards Sapporo
Location
- Location within Hokkaido Location within Japan

Minami-Otaru Station (南小樽駅, Minami-Otaru-eki) is a railway station on the Hakodate Main Line in Otaru, Hokkaido, Japan, operated by Hokkaido Railway Company (JR Hokkaido). The station is numbered "S14".

== Lines ==
Minami-Otaru Station is served by the Hakodate Main Line.

== Layout ==
The station has one island Platform with two tracks. The platform is in a shallow cutting. The station has automated ticket machines, automated turnstiles which accept Kitaca, and a "Midori no Madoguchi" staffed ticket office.

=== Platforms ===
1	■ Hakodate Main Line	for Otaru
2	■ Hakodate Main Line	for Sapporo, Iwamizawa, and New Chitose Airport

== History ==
As one of the intermediate station on the Horonai Railway, Kaiunchō Station (開運町駅) opened on November 11, 1880, provisionally and on November 28 formally. On May 22, 1881, the station was relocated and renamed Sumiyoshi Station (住吉駅) after the station was burned down. It was again renamed as Otaru Station (小樽駅) on June 11, 1900. The present name Minami-Otaru was given on July 15, 1920, when the former Chūō Otaru Station, located closer to the city center, became Otaru Station.

The station became the junction of the lines of Hokkaido Colliery and Railway Company (former Horonai Railway) and the Hokkaido Railway on August 1, 1905. After the nationalization of the two companies in 1906 and 1907, the trunk line connecting Hakodate and Sapporo via Otaru was named the Hakodate Main Line and its branch between Minami-Otaru (then called Otaru) and Temiya was named the Temiya Line. The Temiya Line was abandoned in 1985.

== See also ==
- List of railway stations in Japan
