= Warabitai Station =

Railway station in Oshamambe, Hokkaido, Japan

Warabitai Station 蕨岱駅
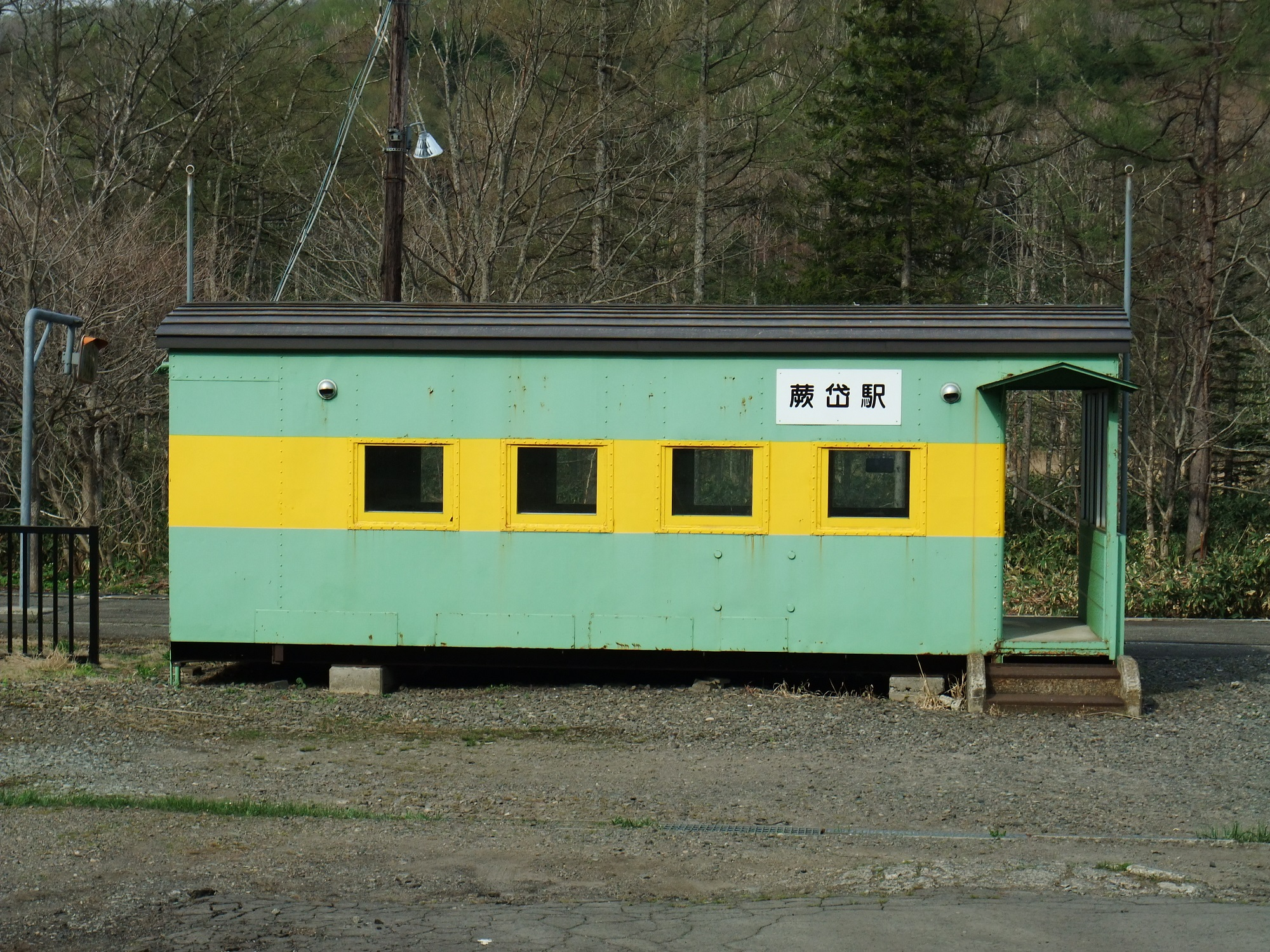
- The station waiting room in May 2015

General information
- Location: Warabitai, Oshamambe, Yamakoshi District, Hokkaido; Japan
- Coordinates: 42°37′35″N 140°18′48″E
- Operator: JR Hokkaido
- Line: ■ Hakodate Main Line
- Distance: 126.9 km from Hakodate
- Platforms: 1 side platform
- Tracks: 1
- Connections: Bus stop

Other information
- Status: Unstaffed
- Station code: S31

History
- Opened: 15 October 1904
- Closed: 3 March 2017

Passengers
- 2013: 0 daily
Location
- Location within Japan

Warabitai Station (蕨岱駅, Warabitai-eki) was a railway station in Oshamambe, Hokkaido, Japan, operated by the Hokkaido Railway Company (JR Hokkaido). Opened in 1904, it closed in March 2017.

== Lines ==
Warabitai Station was served by the Hakodate Main Line, and was situated 126.9 km from the starting point of the line at Hakodate. It was numbered S31.

== Station layout ==
Warabitai Station had a single side platform serving a single track.

== History ==
The station opened on October 15, 1904, as a Hokkaido railway line station. On July 1, 1907, with the nationalization of Hokkaido Railway, the station was transferred to the state-owned railway.

Freight handling at the station was discontinued on February 7, 1975, and luggage handling was discontinued on February 1, 1984. It was destaffed in 1986.

With the privatization of Japanese National Railways (JNR) on 1 April 1987, the station came under the control of JR Hokkaido.

=== Closure ===
The station closed following the last day of services on 3 March 2017.

== Passenger statistics ==
In fiscal 1992, the station was used by an average of 8 passengers daily.

== Origin of name ==
The name is derived from the Ainu word Warunpifuru (ワルンビフル; "Hill of Ferns"). The station name is also the last JR station name when arranged in the Gojuon order.

== Surrounding area ==
- National Route 5
- Mount Kuromatsunai
- Niseko Bus "Warabidai" bus stop

== See also ==
- List of railway stations in Japan
