= Kuroiwa Station =

Railway station in Yakumo, Hokkaido, Japan

H51 Kuroiwa Station 黒岩駅
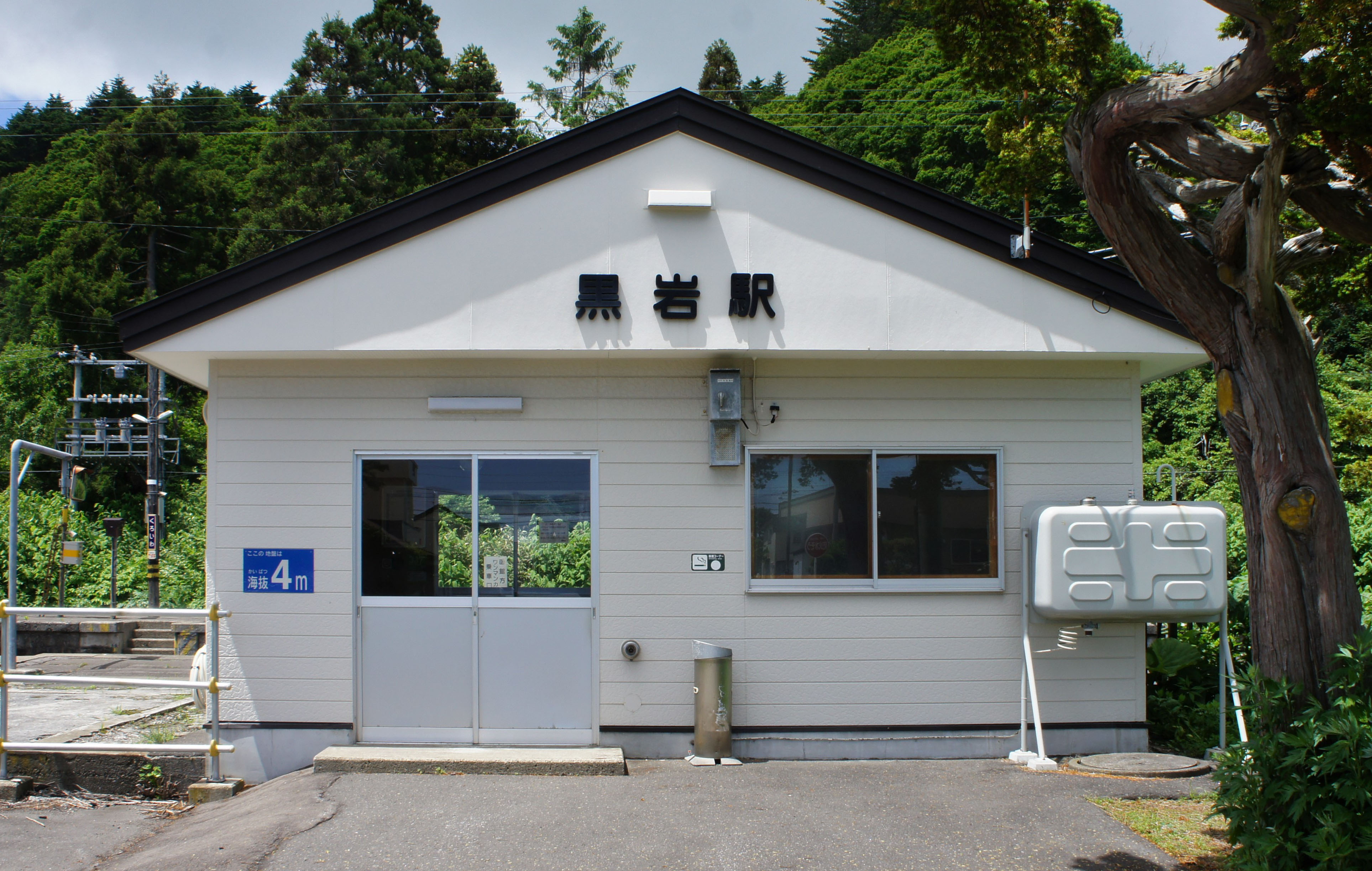

General information
- Location: Kuroiwa, Yakumo, Futami, Hokkaido （北海道二海郡八雲町黒岩） Japan
- Coordinates: 42°22′06″N 140°17′17″E
- Operator: JR Hokkaido
- Line: Hakodate Main Line
- Connections: Bus stop

Other information
- Station code: H51

History
- Opened: 1903
Location

Kuroiwa Station (黒岩駅, Kuroiwa-eki) is a railway station in Yakumo, Futami District, Hokkaidō Prefecture, Japan.

== Lines ==
- Hokkaido Railway Company
  - Hakodate Main Line Station H51

== Surrounding area ==
- National Route 5
- Kuroiwa Post Office
- Kuroiwa Elematary School
- Kuroiwa Junior Highschool
- Hakodate Bus "Kuroiwa Eki-mae" Bus Stop

== History ==
=== Future plans ===
In June 2023, this station was selected to be among 42 stations on the JR Hokkaido network to be slated for abolition owing to low ridership.

== Adjacent stations ==
«	Service	»
Hakodate Main Line
Yamasaki	Local	Kunnui
