= Otaru-Chikkō Station =

Railway station in Hokkaido, Japan

Coordinates: 43.180861°N 141.027806°E

Otaru-Chikkō Station 小樽築港駅
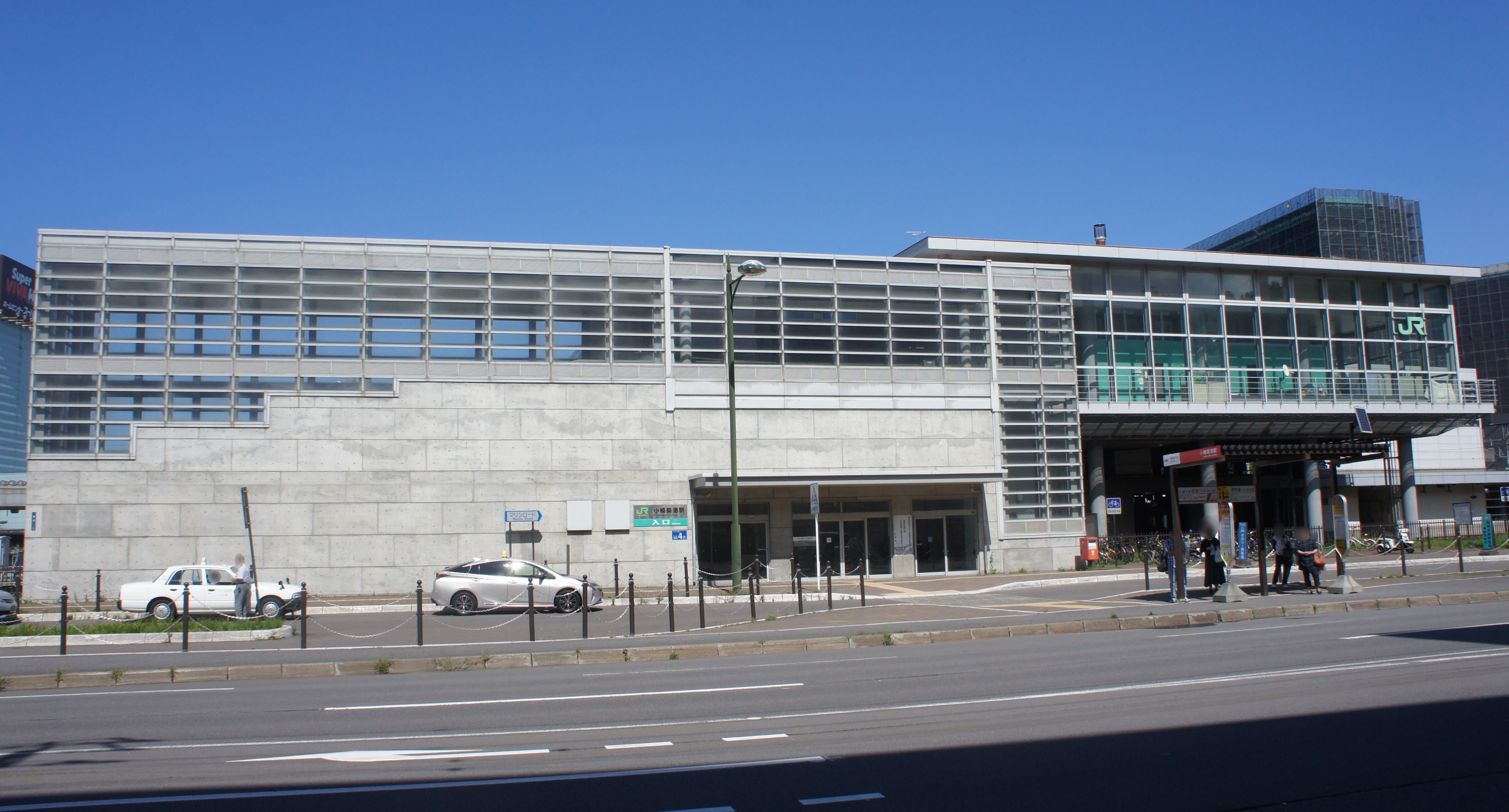
- Otaru-Chikkō Station in September 2018

General information
- Location: 1 Chikkō, Otaru, Hokkaido; Japan
- Operator: JR Hokkaido
- Line: ■ Hakodate Main Line
- Distance: 256.2 km from Hakodate
- Platforms: 1 island platform
- Tracks: 2
- Connections: Bus stop

Other information
- Status: Staffed
- Station code: S13

History
- Opened: November 21, 1910

Passengers
- FY2014: 2,529 daily
Location
- Location within Japan

Otaru-Chikkō Station (小樽築港駅, Otaru-Chikkō-eki) is a railway station on the Hakodate Main Line in Otaru, Hokkaido, Japan, operated by the Hokkaido Railway Company (JR Hokkaido). The station is numbered "S13".

== Lines ==
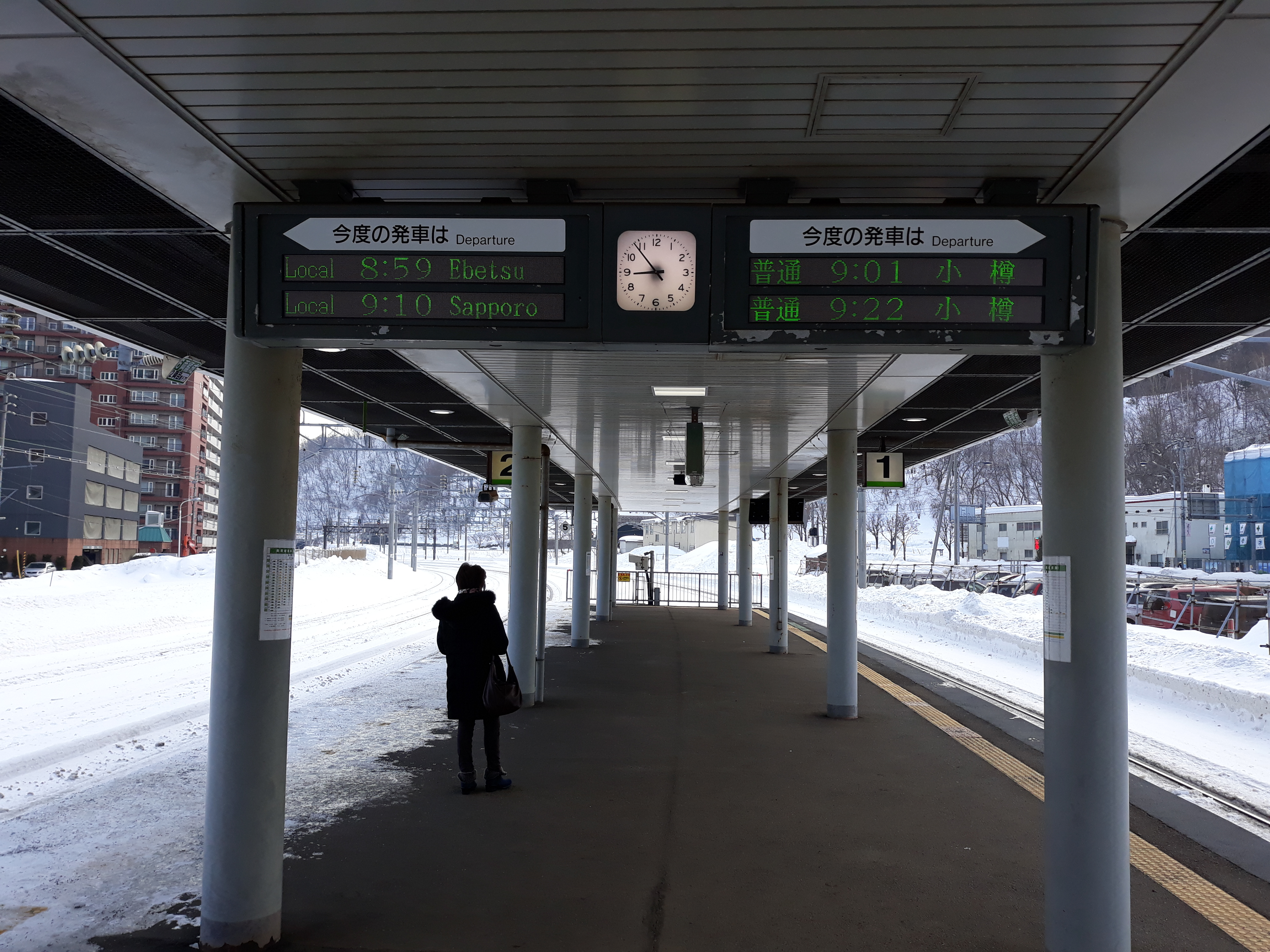
Scenery of Platform. Number 1 Platform is bound for Otaru Station, Number 2 Platform is bound for Sapporo Station and New Chitose Airport Station.

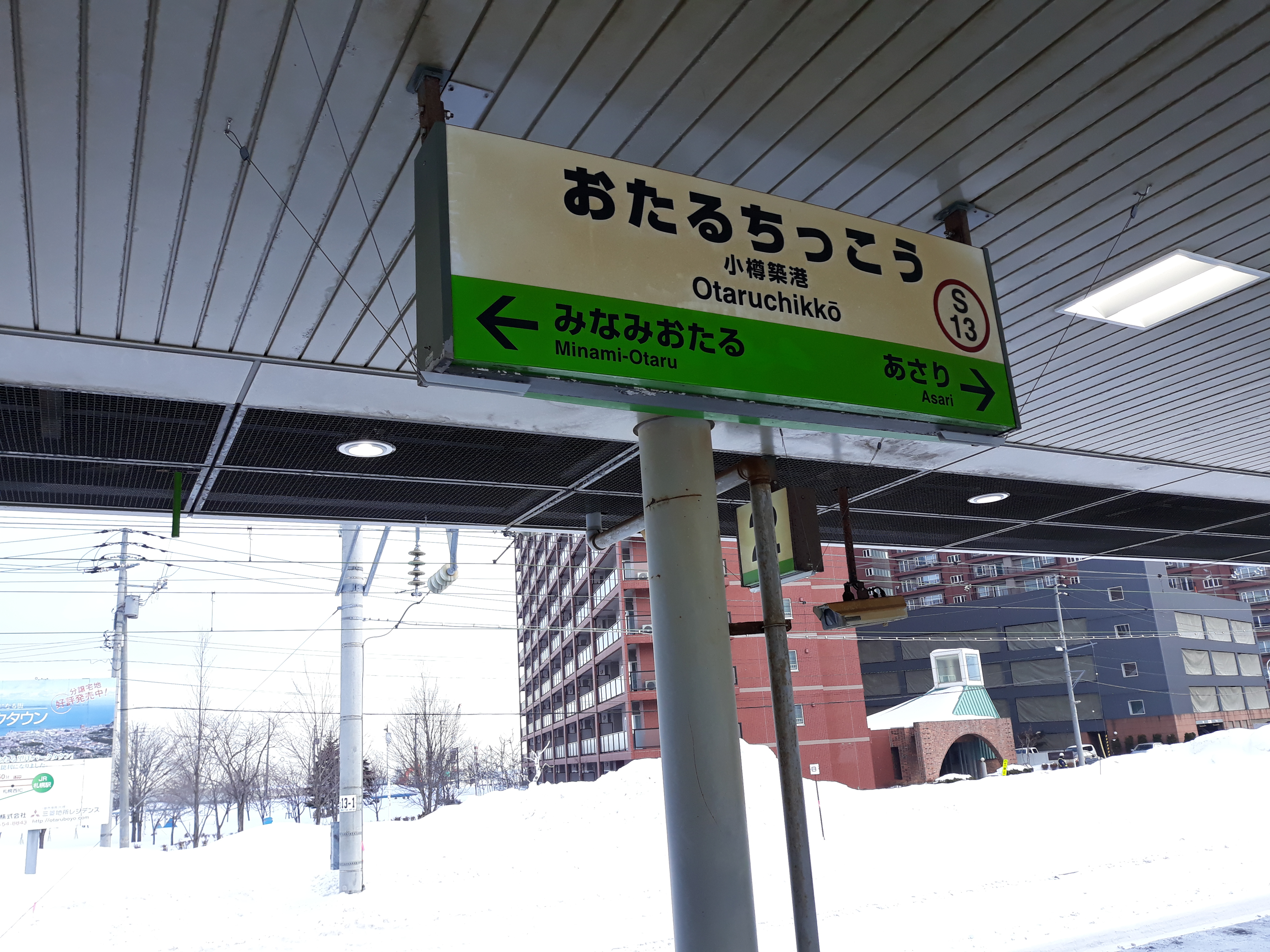
Station Sign

Otaru-Chikkō Station is served by the Hakodate Main Line.

== Station layout ==
The station has one island platform serving two tracks. The station has automated ticket machines, automated turnstiles which accept Kitaca, and a "Midori no Madoguchi" staffed ticket office.

=== Platforms ===
1	■ Hakodate Main Line	for Otaru
2	■ Hakodate Main Line	for Sapporo, Iwamizawa, and New Chitose Airport

== Adjacent stations ==
«	Service	»
Hakodate Main Line
Minami-Otaru (S14)	Rapid Airport/Niseko Liner	Teine (S07)
Minami-Otaru (S14)	Semi-Rapid Ishikari Liner	Asari (S12)
Minami-Otaru (S14)	Local	Asari (S12)

== History ==
Otaru-Chikkō Station opened on 21 November 1910. With the privatization of Japanese National Railways (JNR) on 1 April 1987, the station came under the control of JR Hokkaido.

== Surrounding area ==
Otaru-Chikkō Station is connected to the Wing Bay Otaru shopping mall and the Grand Park Hotel Otaru via a pedestrian footbridge.

- Wing Bay Otaru
- Grand Park Otaru

== See also ==
- List of railway stations in Japan
