= Higashiyama Station (Hokkaido) =

Former railway station in Mori, Hokkaido, Japan

Coordinates: 42°03′42″N 140°36′19″E

Higashiyama Station 東山駅
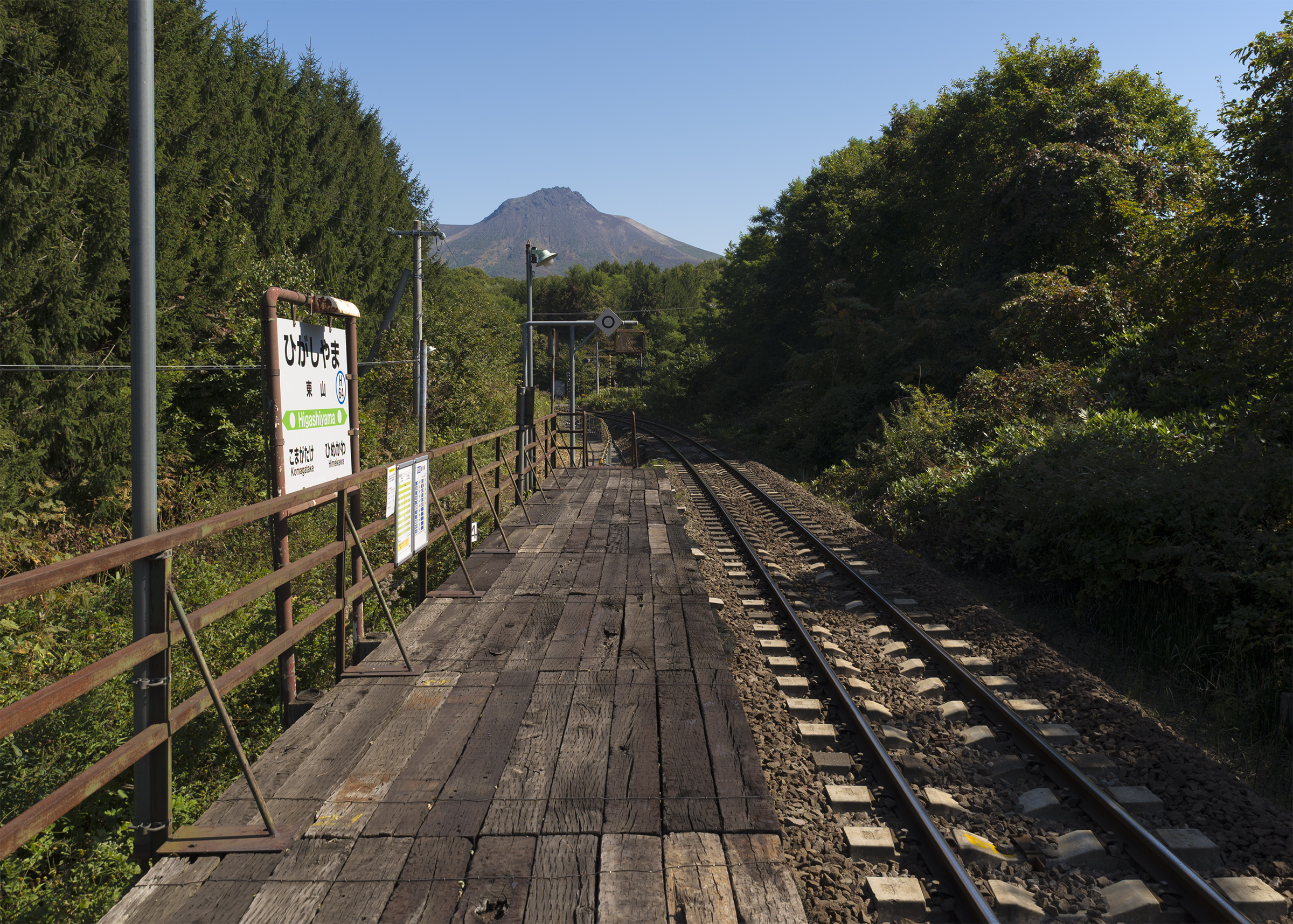
- The station platform in September 2014

General information
- Location: Mori, Hokkaido; Japan
- Operator: JR Hokkaido
- Line: ■ Hakodate Main Line
- Distance: 40.1 km from the starting point of the line at Hakodate
- Platforms: 1 side platform
- Tracks: 1

Other information
- Status: Closed
- Station code: H64

History
- Opened: 1 August 1949
- Closed: 3 March 2017
Location
- Location within Japan

Higashiyama Station (東山駅, Higashiyama-eki) was a railway station on the Hakodate Main Line in Mori, Hokkaido, Japan, operated by Hokkaido Railway Company (JR Hokkaido). Opened in 1949, it closed in March 2017.

== Lines ==
Higashiyama Station was served by the Hakodate Main Line, and was situated 40.1 km from the starting point of the line at Hakodate. The station was numbered "H64".

According to the timetable of March 2009, the station was served by four northbound and four southbound trains per day. Many other trains, including two northbound and one southbound local trains per day, pass through the station.

== History ==
The station began operation as Higashiyama Signal Box (東山信号場, Higashiyama Shingōjō) on February 26, 1943. On August 1, 1949, it became Higashiyama Temporary Station (東山仮乗降場, Higashiyama Kari-jōkōjō). On April 1, 1987, with the privatization of Japanese National Railways (JNR), the station came under the control of JR Hokkaido, and was promoted to become a full station.

=== Closure ===
The station closed following the last day of services on 3 March 2017.

== See also ==
- List of railway stations in Japan
