= Hamanasu (train) =

Japanese train service

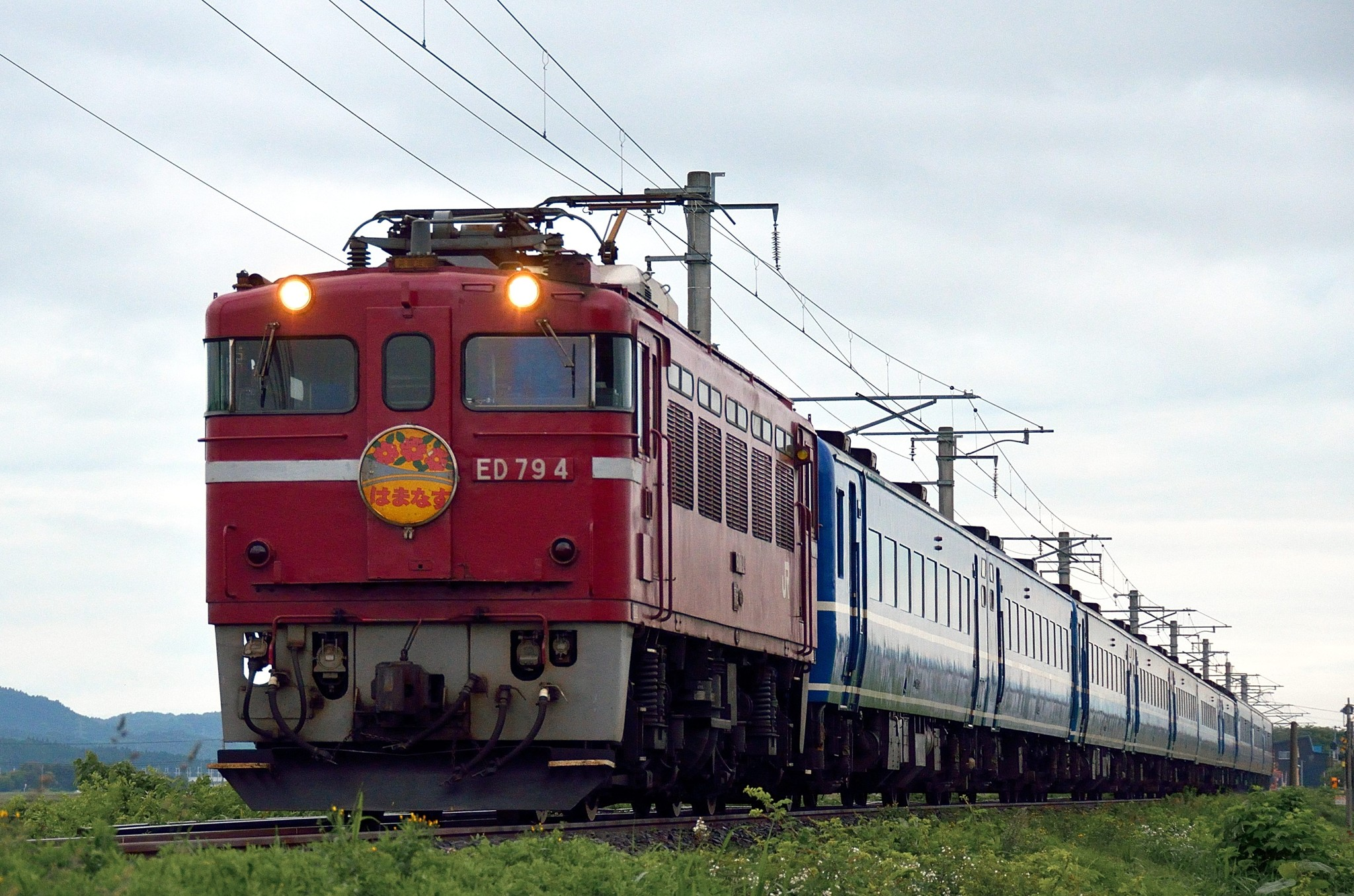
- A Hamanasu service in June 2013 headed by a Class ED79 electric locomotive

Overview
- Service type: Express
- Status: Discontinued
- Locale: Japan
- First service: June 1955 (Semi Express); March 1988 (Overnight Express)
- Last service: March 2016
- Former operator(s): ■ JNR; ■ JR Hokkaido

Route
- Termini: Aomori; Sapporo
- Distance travelled: Approx. 480 km
- Average journey time: Approx. 7 hours 30 minutes
- Service frequency: 1 return service daily

On-board services
- Seating arrangements: 2+2 reclining seating
- Sleeping arrangements: Compartments/carpeted floor accommodation
- Catering facilities: None

Technical
- Rolling stock: 14/24 series coaches
- Track gauge: 1,067 mm (3 ft 6 in)
- Electrification: 20 kV AC / diesel
- Operating speed: 110 km/h (70 mph)

The Hamanasu (はまなす) was an overnight express train service in Japan operated by Hokkaido Railway Company (JR Hokkaido), which ran from Aomori to Sapporo via the Tsugaru Line, Kaikyō Line, Esashi Line, Hakodate Main Line, Muroran Main Line, and Chitose Line. The journey took approximately seven and a half hours. Following the withdrawal of the Ginga overnight express service between Tokyo and Osaka in 2008, the Hamanasu became the only locomotive-hauled express service in Japan. The service was discontinued in March 2016 and some cars were donated to the State Railway of Thailand and refurbished as excursion train named Royal Blossom.

== Rolling stock ==
The train was formed of 14 and 24 series seating cars and sleeping cars based at JR Hokkaido's Sapporo Depot, typically consisting of 7 cars. The train was hauled by a JR Hokkaido Hakodate-based Class ED79 AC electric locomotive between Aomori and Hakodate, and by a Hakodate-based Class DD51 diesel locomotive between Hakodate and Sapporo.

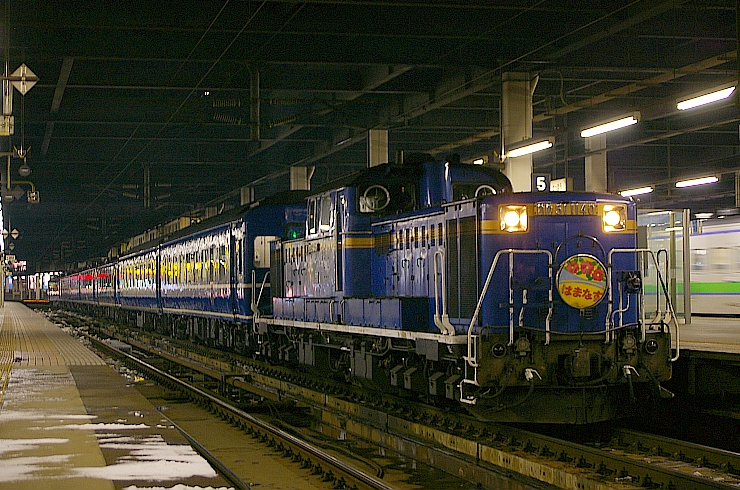
A Hamanasu service at Sapporo Station in January 2005, headed by a Class DD51 diesel locomotive

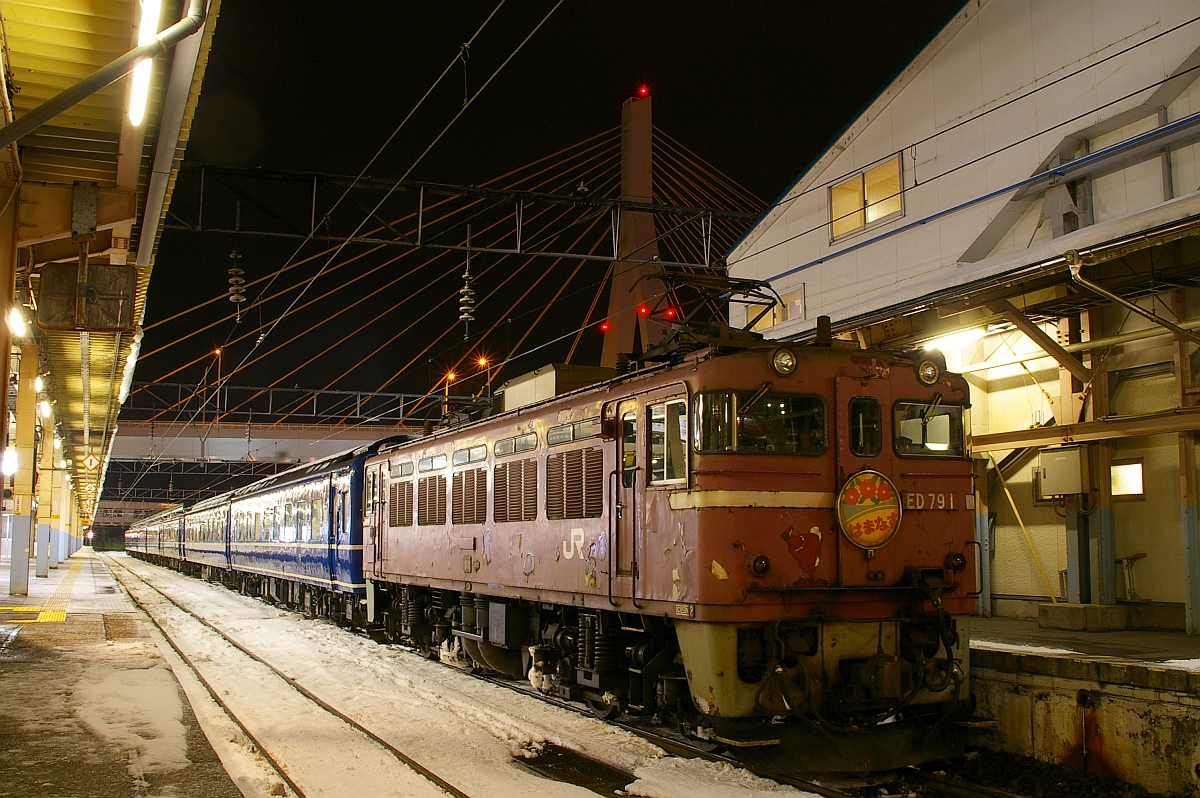
A Hamanasu service at Aomori Station in January 2005, headed by a Class ED79 locomotive

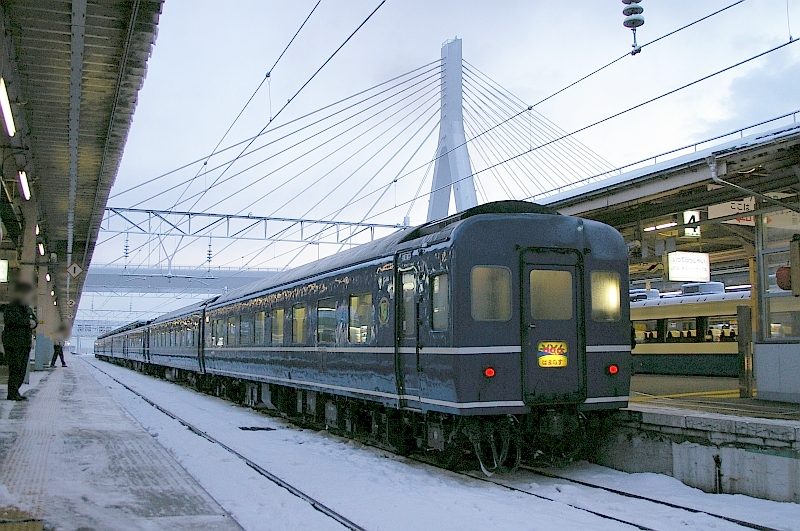
The rear of a Hamanasu service at Aomori Station in March 2007

The typical formation in 2010 was as follows.

1. SuHaNeFu 14-550 (Sleeping car with generator)
2. OHaNe 24-500 (Sleeping car)
3. SuHaFu 14-550 (Non-reserved seating car with generator)
4. OHa 14-500 (Reserved "Nobinobi Carpet" sleeping car)
5. OHa 14-500 (Reserved "Dream car" seating car)
6. OHa 14-500 (Reserved "Dream car" seating car)
7. SuHaFu 14-500 (Non-reserved seating car with generator)

The "Dream cars" used reclining seats from former Green cars.

=== Interior ===
==== Sleeping car accommodation ====
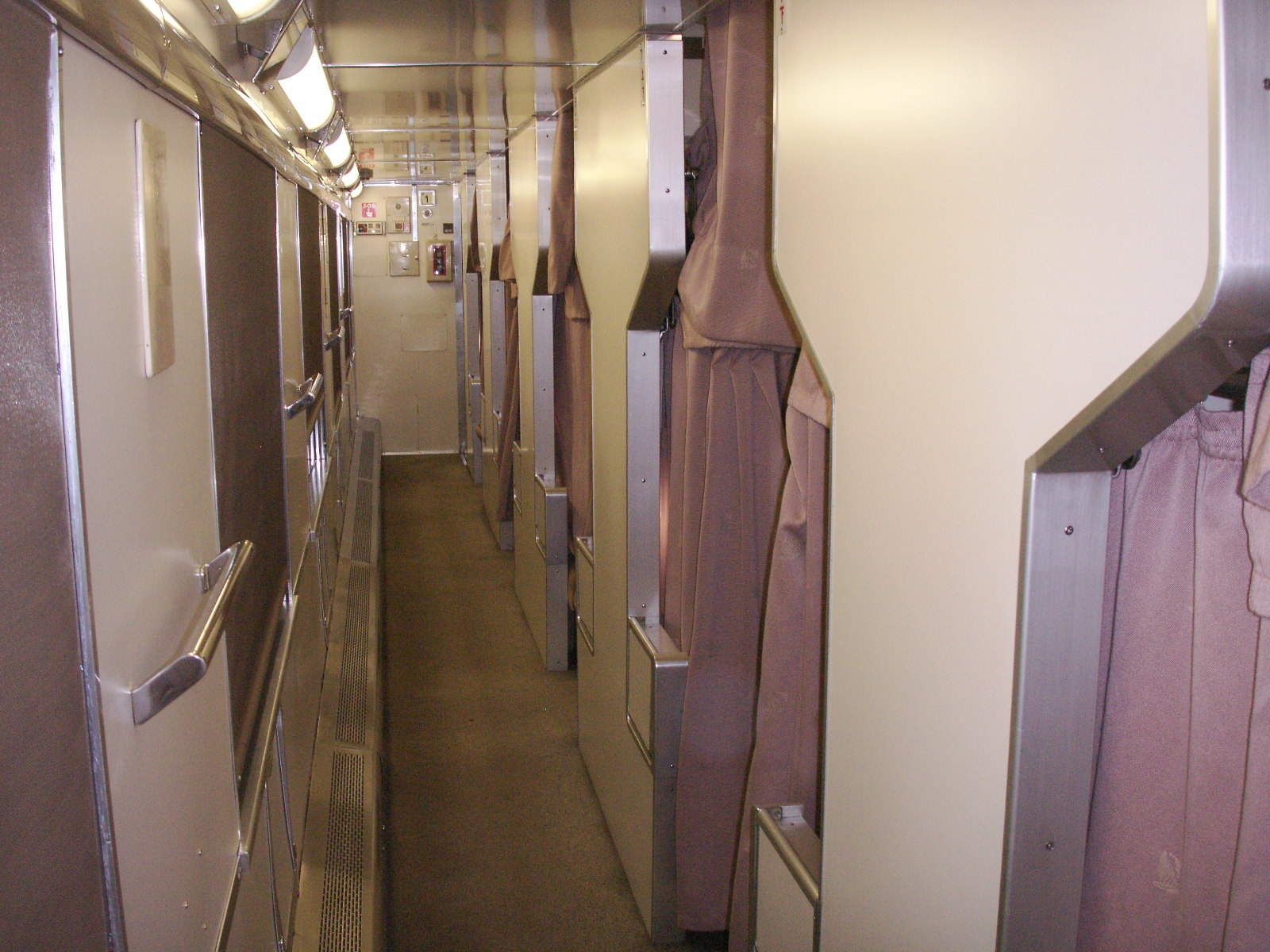
Sleeping car interior, January 2009

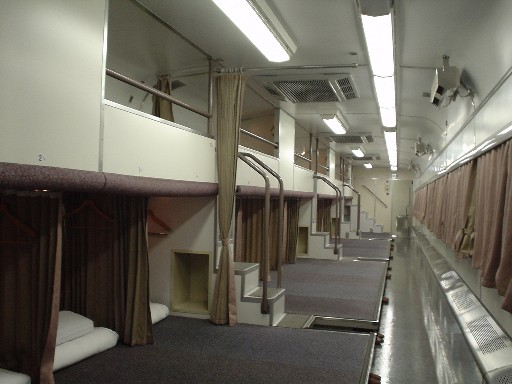
"Nobinobi Carpet" car interior, July 2004

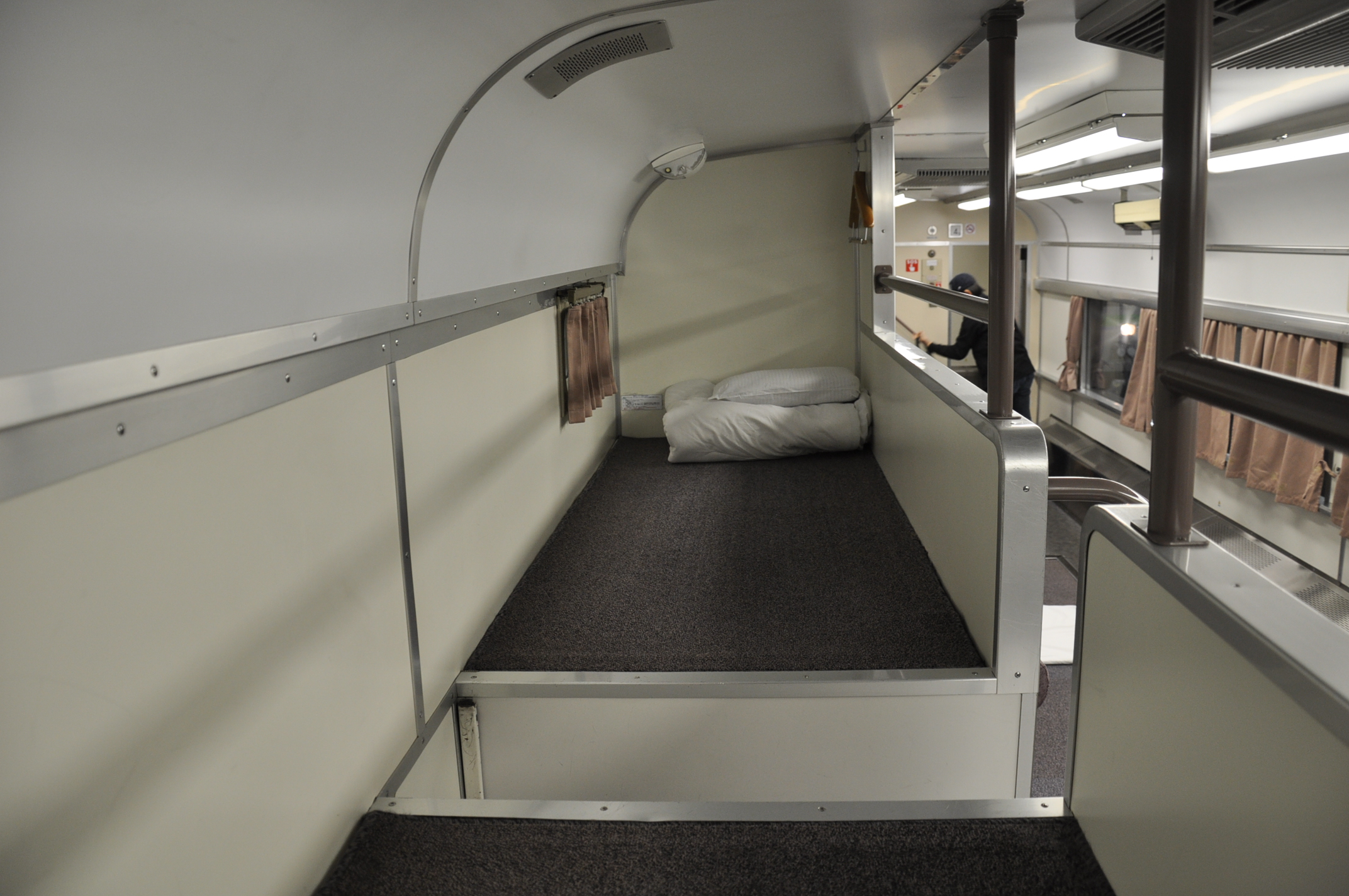
"Nobinobi Carpet" car interior (upper level)

==== Seating car accommodation ====
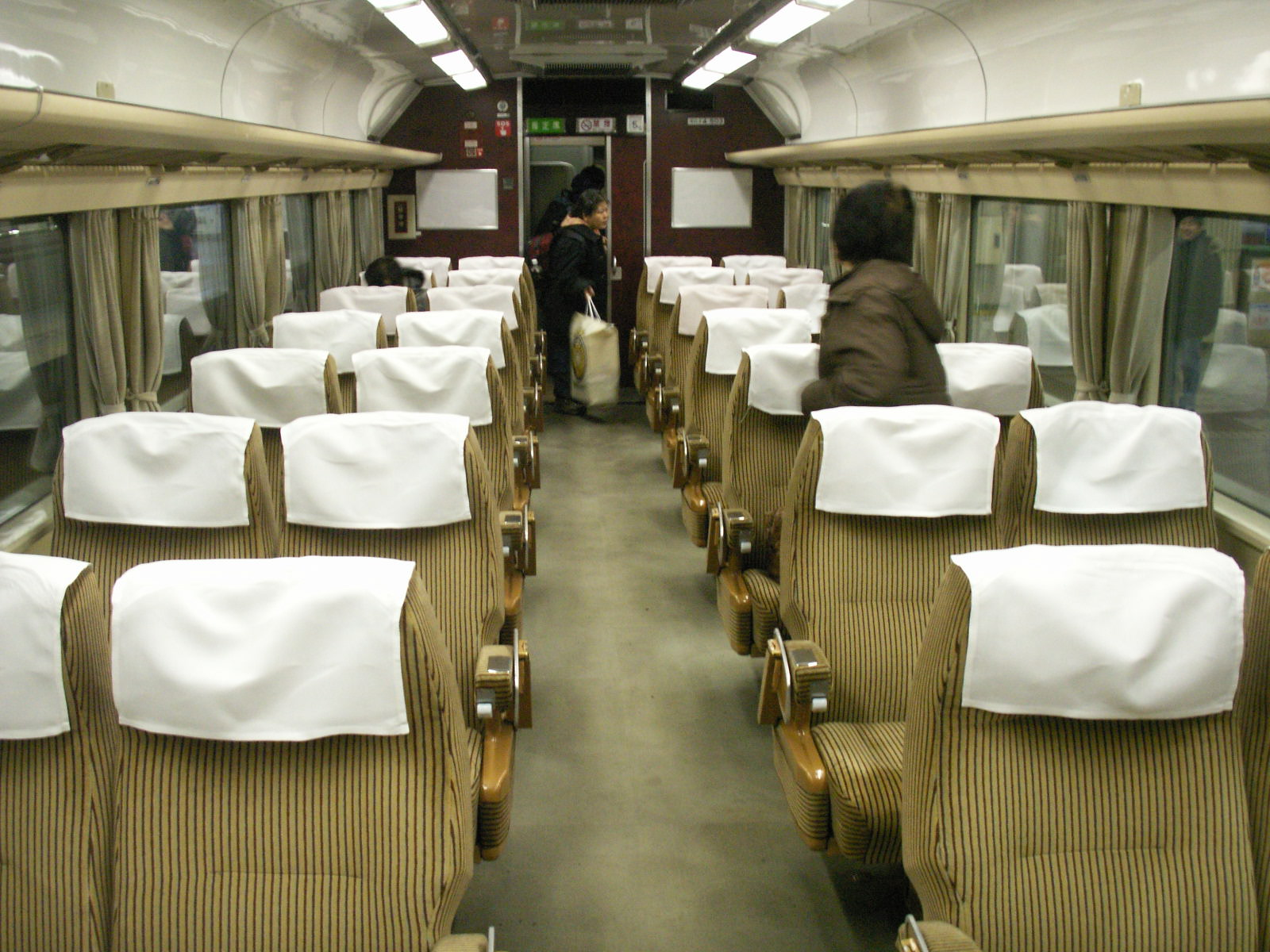
Reserved seating

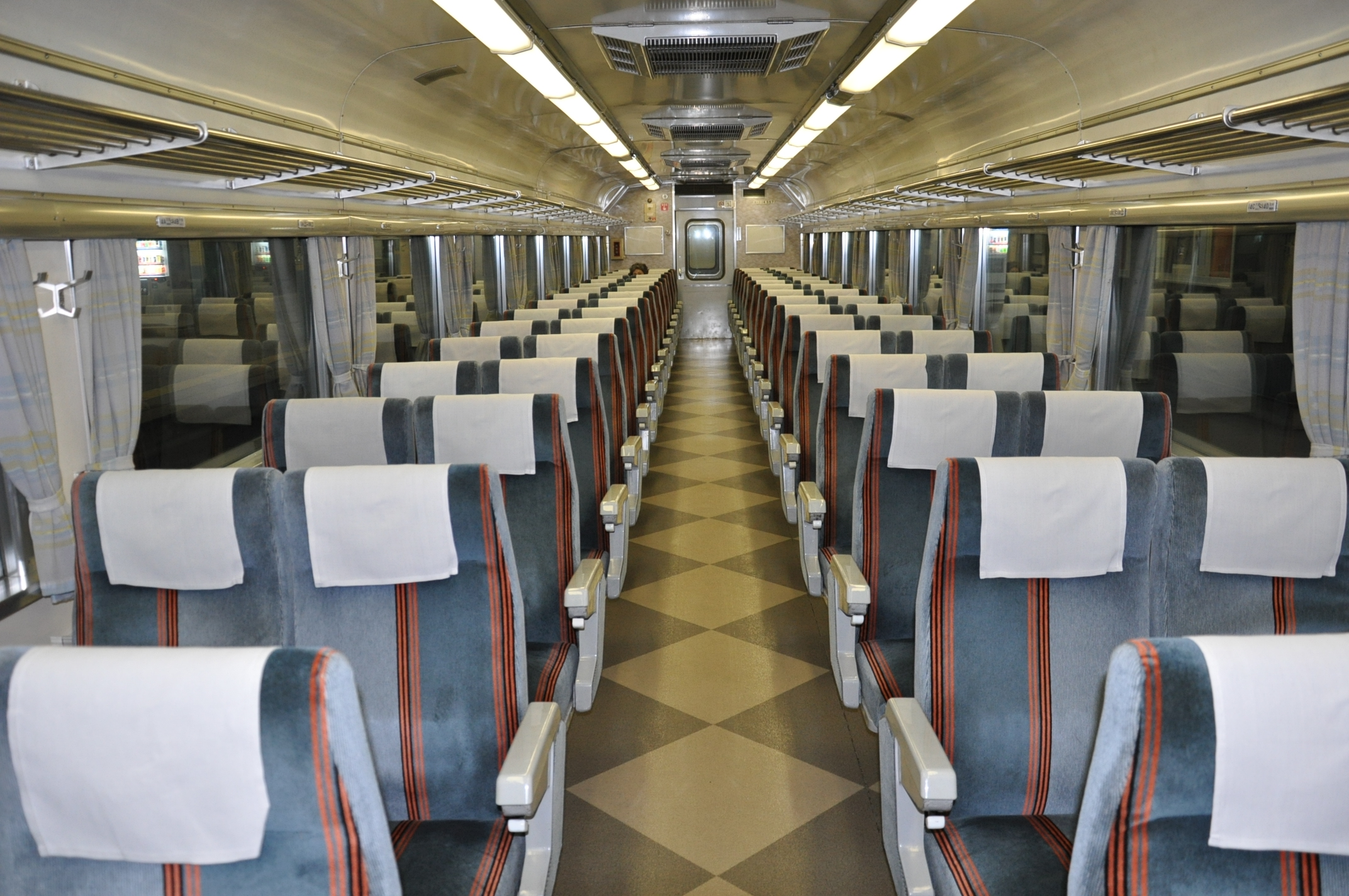
Non-reserved seating

== History ==
The Hamanasu was introduced on 1 June 1955 as a semi-express operating between Hakodate and Abashiri via Sapporo. From 1 October 1961, this was upgraded to Express status as a service operating between Sapporo and Abashiri. This operated until 30 September 1968, when the services were integrated with the Taisetsu (大雪) express services.

The Hamanasu name was revived from 13 March 1988 for use on overnight express services between Aomori and Sapporo following the opening of the Seikan Tunnel. Initially, the train consisted of five 14 series seating cars only (with two designated as reserved seating cars), but from July 1991, two sleeping cars were included in the formation. From March 1997, a "Nobinobi Carpet" sleeping car was also added.

=== Withdrawal ===
The last Hamanasu services were discontinued in March 2016 ahead of the opening of the Hokkaido Shinkansen high-speed line. The last up service departed from Sapporo Station on 20 March 2016, and the last down service departed from Aomori on 21 March, arriving at Sapporo on 22 March.

Reasons cited by JR Hokkaido for discontinuing the service included (1) the locomotives used to haul the train through the Seikan Tunnel not being able to operate through the tunnel after March 2016, (2) the lack of funds to purchase new locomotives, (3) the difficulties in securing paths through the tunnel at night due to inspections of the shinkansen infrastructure, and (4) aging rolling stock dating from 40 years ago.

=== New JR Hokkaido Hamanasu Tourist Train ===
JR Hokkaido has revived the Hamanasu name giving it to one of two multi-use Series 5000 tourist trains. These trains, remodelled Series 261 DMU's, are expected to replace the Crystal Express and the North Rainbow Express.

=== SRT Royal Blossom ===
As of August 2025, 2 sets of Royal Blossom are in service for excursion train and chartered train.

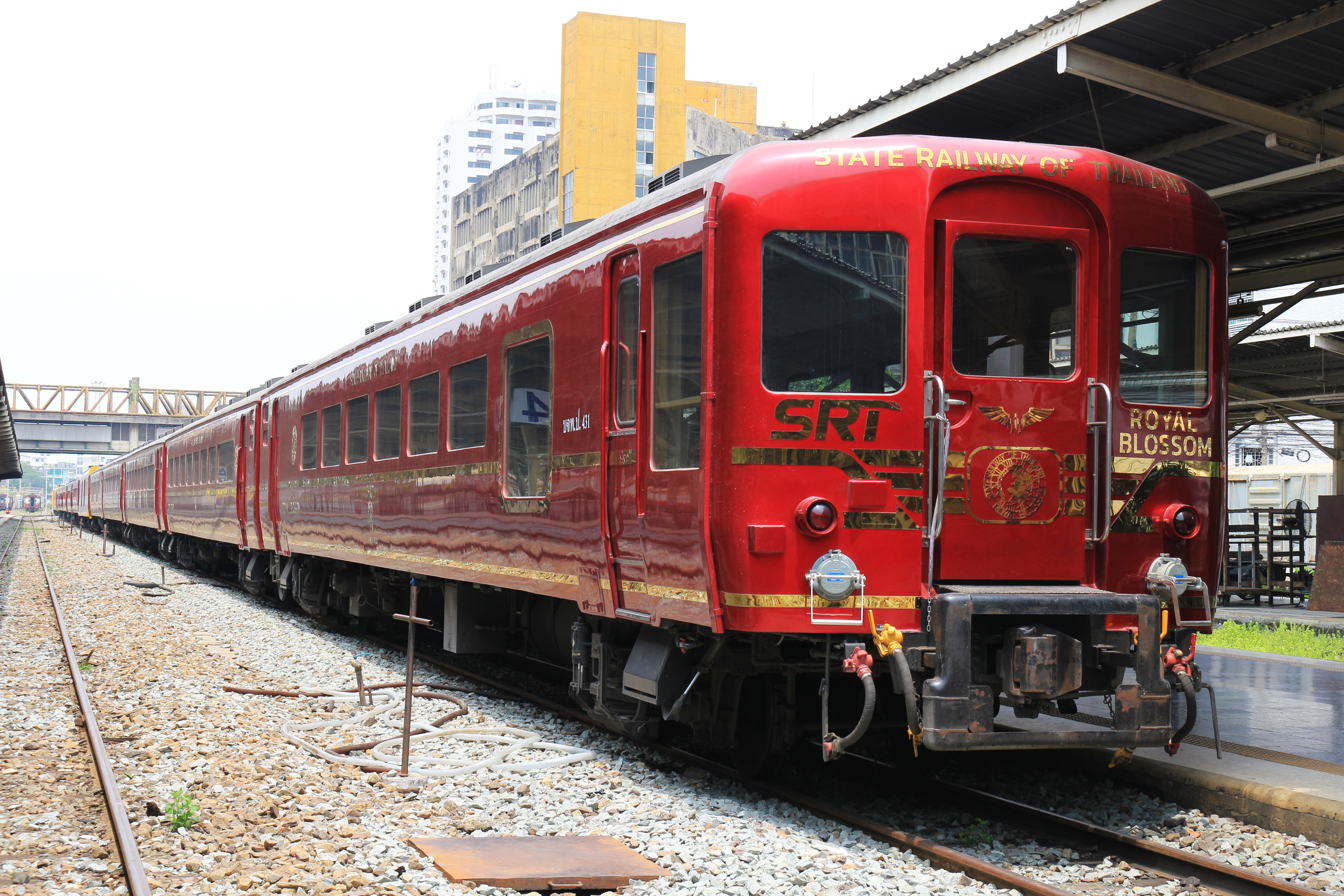
Royal Blossom set 1 (front) and set 2 (back)

== See also ==
- Blue Train (Japan)
