= Asari Station (Hokkaido) =

Railway station in Otaru, Hokkaido, Japan

Asari Station 朝里駅
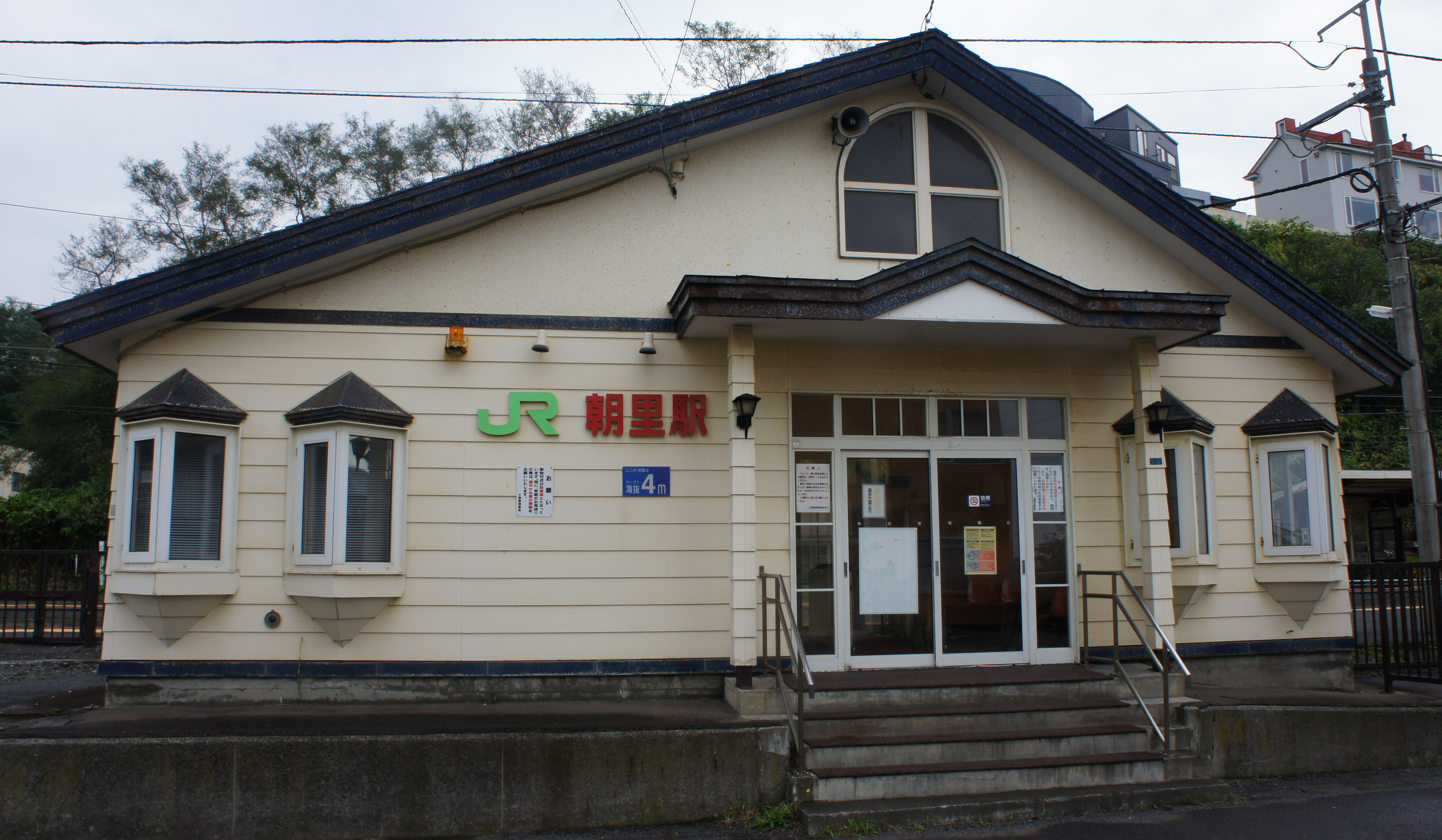
- The station building in August 2018 Location Nishi 15-chōme, Kita-11-jō, Chūō, Location Nishi 15-chōme, Kita-11-jō, Chūō,

General information
- Location: Otaru, Hokkaido; Japan
- Coordinates: 43°10′37″N 141°03′52″E
- Operator: JR Hokkaido
- Line: ■ Hakodate Main Line
- Distance: 259.3 km from Hakodate
- Platforms: 2 side platforms
- Tracks: 2

Other information
- Status: Unstaffed
- Station code: S12

History
- Opened: November 28, 1880

Passengers
- FY2012: 282 daily
Location
- Location within Japan

Asari Station (朝里駅, Asari-eki) is a railway station in Otaru, Hokkaido, Japan, operated by Hokkaido Railway Company (JR Hokkaido). The station is numbered S12.

== Lines ==
Asari Station is served by the Hakodate Main Line

== Station layout ==
The station consists of two ground-level opposed side platforms connected by a footbridge, serving two tracks. The station has automated ticket machines and Kitaca card readers. The station is unattended.

=== Platforms ===
1	■ Hakodate Main Line	for Otaru
2	■ Hakodate Main Line	for Sapporo, Iwamizawa, and New Chitose Airport

== Adjacent stations ==
«	Service	»
Hakodate Main Line
Otaru-Chikkō (S13)	Semi-Rapid	Zenibako (S11)
Otaru-Chikkō (S13)	Local	Zenibako (S11)
Rapid: Does not stop at this station

== History ==
The station opened on November 28, 1880, as a flag station.

The area around the station was used as a location in the 2008 music video for Death Cab for Cutie's "I Will Possess Your Heart".

== See also ==
- List of railway stations in Japan
