= Himekawa Station (Hokkaido) =

Former railway station in Mori, Hokkaido, Japan

Coordinates: 42°04′53″N 140°35′30″E

Himekawa Station 姫川駅
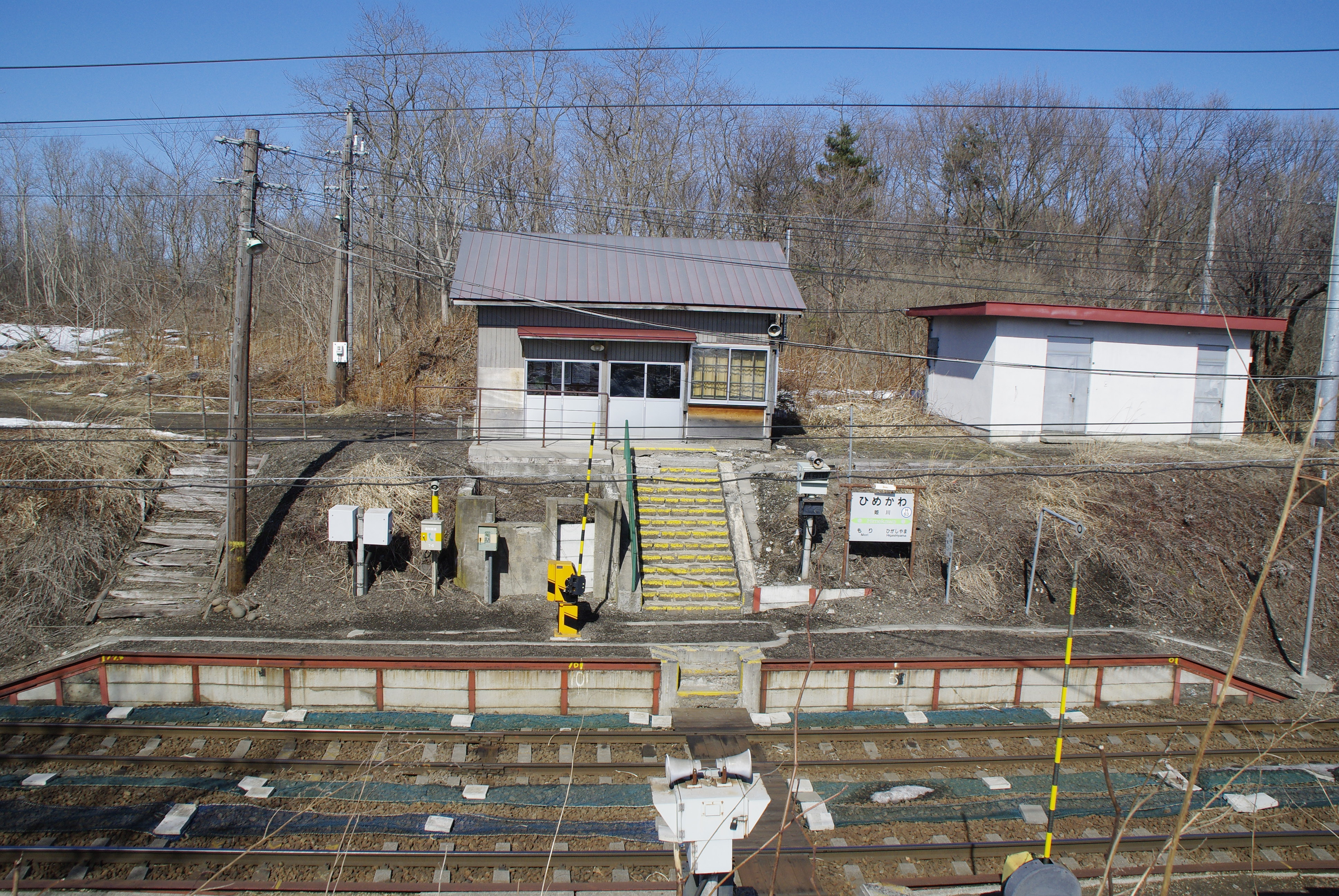
- Himekawa Station platforms and structure in March 2009

General information
- Location: Himekawa, Mori-machi, Kayabe-gun, Hokkaido 049–2306; Japan
- Operator: JR Hokkaido
- Line: ■ Hakodate Main Line
- Distance: 44.2 km from Hakodate
- Platforms: 2 side platforms
- Tracks: 2

Other information
- Status: Closed
- Station code: H63

History
- Opened: 19 May 1951
- Closed: 4 March 2017

Passengers
- FY2015: <1 daily
Location
- Location within Japan

Himekawa Station (姫川駅, Himekawa-eki) was a railway station on the Hakodate Main Line in Mori, Hokkaido, Japan, operated by Hokkaido Railway Company (JR Hokkaido). Opened in 1951, it closed in March 2017.

== Lines ==
Himekawa Station was served by the Hakodate Main Line, and was situated 44.2 km from the starting point of the line at Hakodate. The station was numbered "H63".

== Station layout ==
The station has two side platforms that once served two tracks on the otherwise single line. The platforms are linked by a level crossing for passenger use. The station was unstaffed.

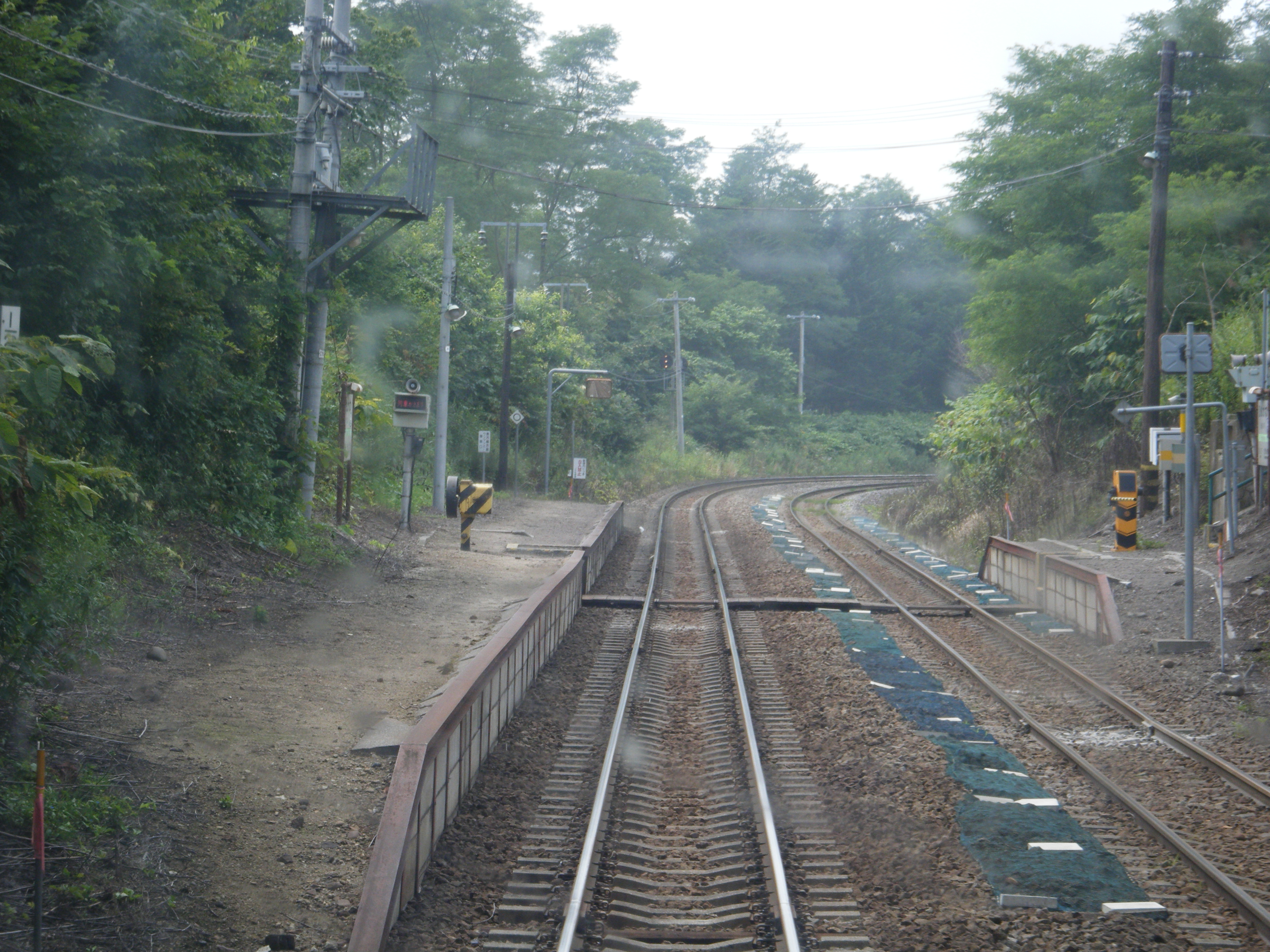
The platforms as viewed from an approaching train in August 2009

== History ==
The station opened on 19 May 1951. With the privatization of Japanese National Railways (JNR) on 1 April 1987, the station came under the control of JR Hokkaido.

In June 2016, JR Hokkaido announced that it intended to close the station along with four other unstaffed stations on the line in March 2017, due to low passenger usage.

== Passenger statistics ==
In fiscal 2015, the station was used on average by less than one passenger daily.

== Surrounding area ==
- National Route 5

== See also ==
- List of railway stations in Japan
