= Kunnui Station =

Railway station in Oshamambe, Hokkaido, Japan

H49 Kunnui Station 国縫駅
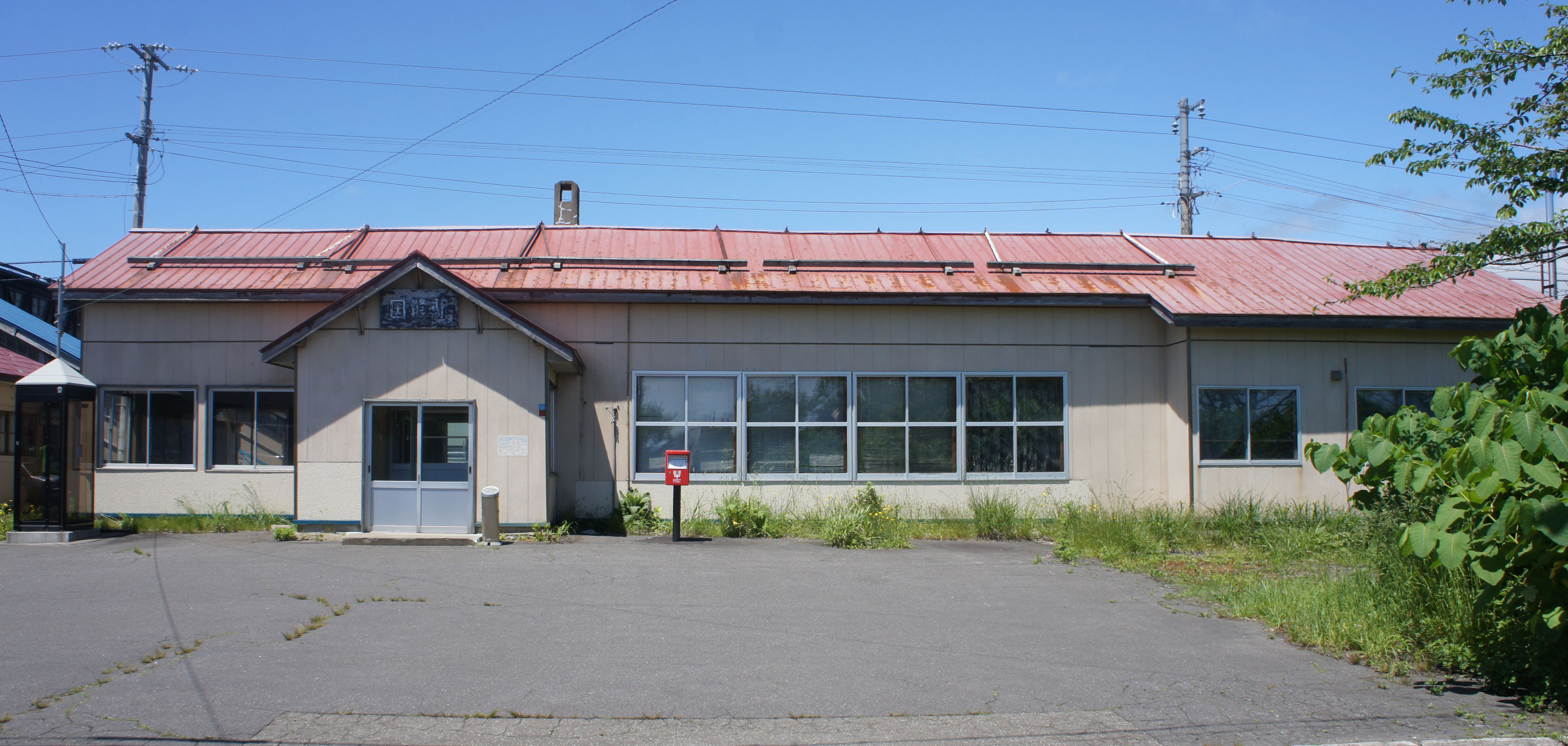
- Kunnui station building

General information
- Location: Kunnui, Oshamambe, Yamakoshi, Hokkaido （北海道山越郡長万部町字国縫） Japan
- Coordinates: 42°26′22″N 140°19′15″E
- Operator: JR Hokkaido
- Line: Hakodate Main Line
- Connections: Bus stop

Other information
- Station code: H49

History
- Opened: 1903
Location

Kunnui Station (国縫駅, Kunnui-eki) is a railway station in Oshamambe, Hokkaidō, Japan.

== Lines ==
- Hokkaido Railway Company
  - Hakodate Main Line Station H49

== Surrounding area ==
- National Route 5
- National Route 230
- Hokkaidō Expressway Kunnui IC
- Kunnui Post Office
- Hakodate Bus "Kunnui" Bus Stop

== Adjacent stations ==
«	Service	»
Hakodate Main Line
Kuroiwa	Local	Oshamambe
