= Osamunai Station =

Railway station in Fukagawa, Hokkaido, Japan

Osamunai Station 納内駅
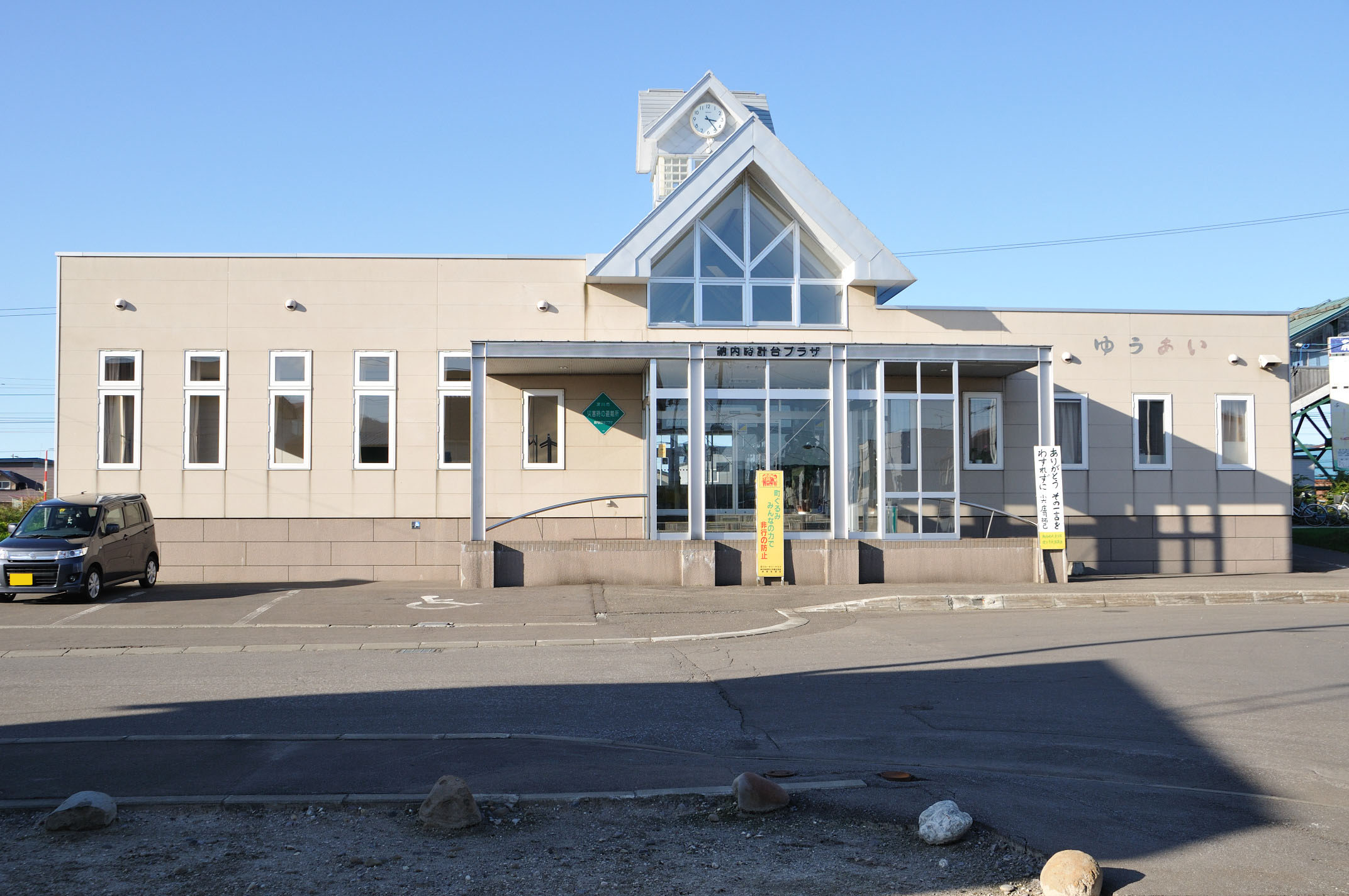

General information
- Location: Moseushi, Uryū District, Hokkaidō; Japan
- Coordinates: 43.6912°N 141.9664°E
- Operator: JR Hokkaido
- Line: Hakodate Main Line
Location

Osamunai Station (納内駅, Osamunai-eki) is a railway station in Fukagawa, Hokkaidō, Japan. It is operated by the Hokkaido Railway Company (JR Hokkaido).

== Lines ==
- Hokkaido Railway Company
  - Hakodate Main Line Station A25

== Adjacent stations ==
«	Service	»
Hakodate Main Line
Limited Express Sōya: Does not stop at this station
Limited Express Okhotsk: Does not stop at this station
Fukagawa	Local	Chikabumi
