= Chikabumi Station =

Railway station in Asahikawa, Hokkaido, Japan

Chikabumi Station 近文駅
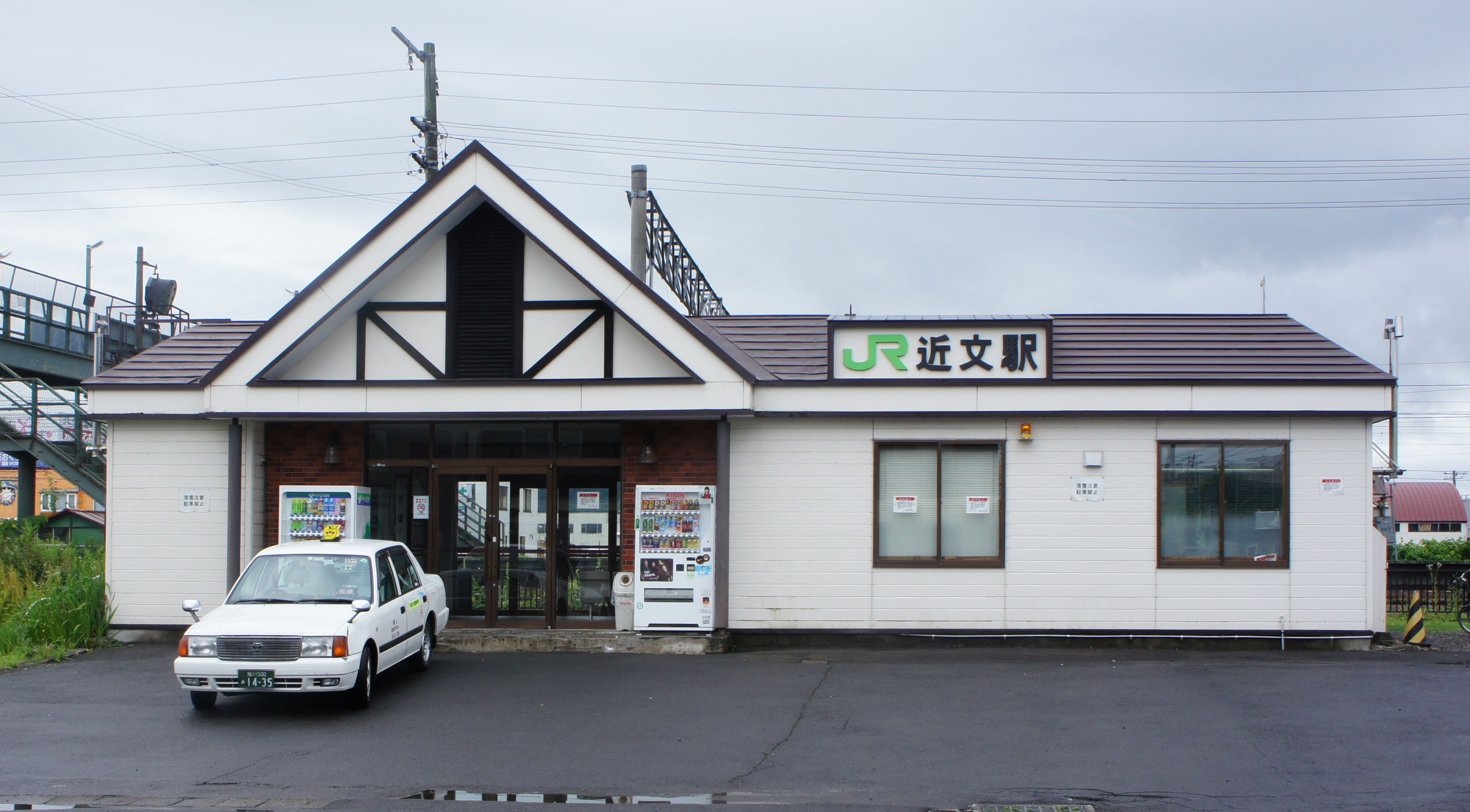
- Chikabumi Station entrance

General information
- Location: Chikabumi-cho 20-chome, Asahikawa, Hokkaido （北海道旭川市近文町20丁目） Japan
- Coordinates: 43°47′22″N 142°19′32″E
- Operator: JR Hokkaido
- Line: Hakodate Main Line
- Connections: Bus stop

Other information
- Station code: A27

History
- Opened: 1911

Services
Preceding station	JR Hokkaido	Following station
Osamunai towards Hakodate	Hakodate Main Line Local	Asahikawa Terminus
Location

Chikabumi Station (近文駅, Chikabumi-eki) is a railway station in Asahikawa, Hokkaidō, Japan.

== Lines ==
- Hokkaido Railway Company
  - Hakodate Main Line Station A27

== Adjacent stations ==
«	Service	»
Hakodate Main Line
Limited Express Sōya: Does not stop at this station
Limited Express Okhotsk: Does not stop at this station
Osamunai	Local	Asahikawa
