= Yamasaki Station =

Railway station in Yakumo, Hokkaido, Japan

Coordinates: 42.3143°N 140.2744°E

Yamasaki Station 山崎駅
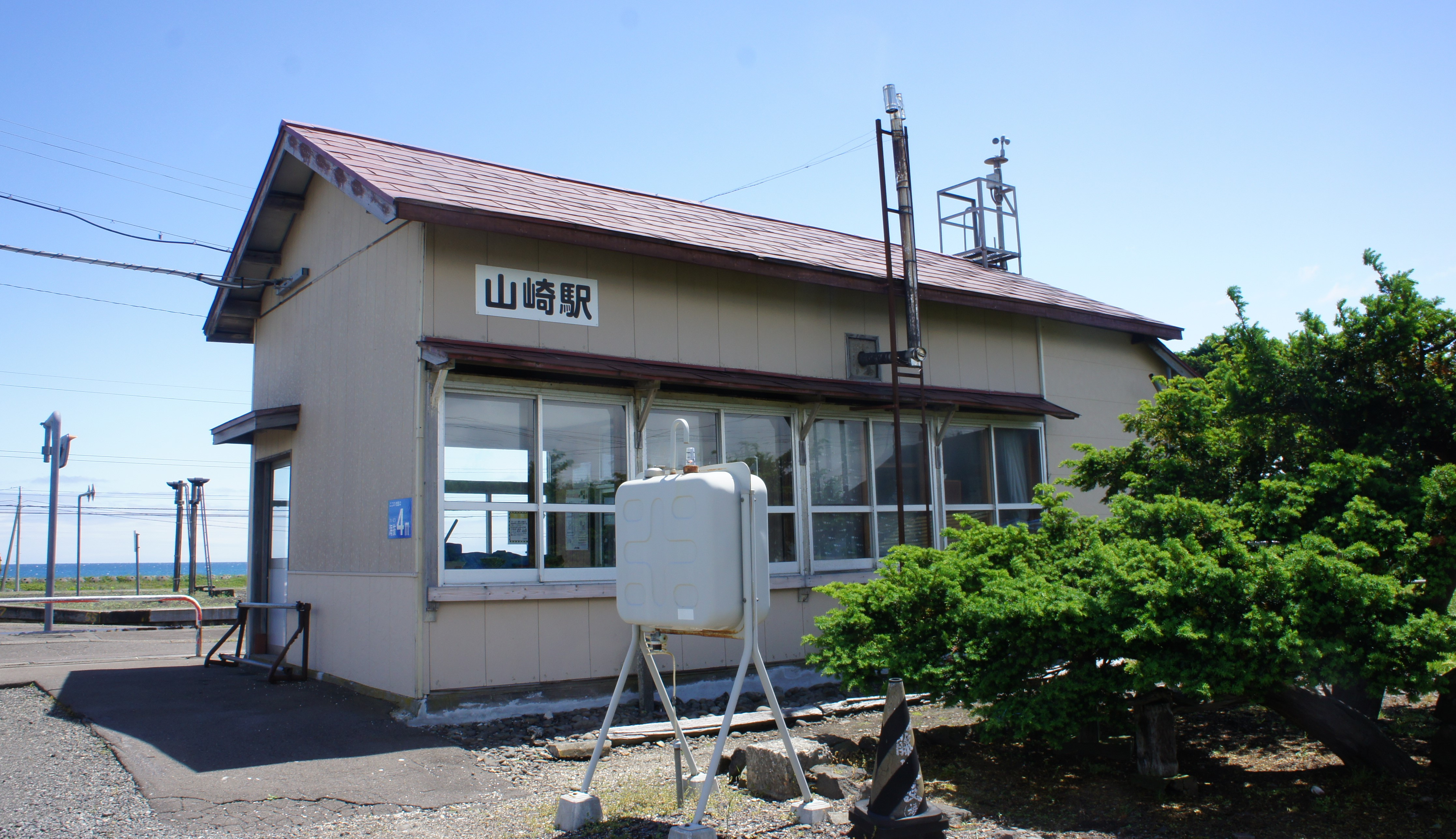
Location

Yamasaki Station (山崎駅, Yamasaki-eki) is a railway station in Yakumo, Futami District, Hokkaidō Prefecture, Japan.

== Lines ==
- Hokkaido Railway Company
  - Hakodate Main Line Station H52

== History ==
=== Future plans ===
In June 2023, this station was selected to be among 42 stations on the JR Hokkaido network to be slated for abolition owing to low ridership.

== Adjacent stations ==
«	Service	»
Hakodate Main Line
Yakumo	Local	Kuroiwa
