= Hassamu Station =

Railway station in Sapporo, Japan

Coordinates: 43.1001°N 141.2761°E

Hassamu Station 発寒駅
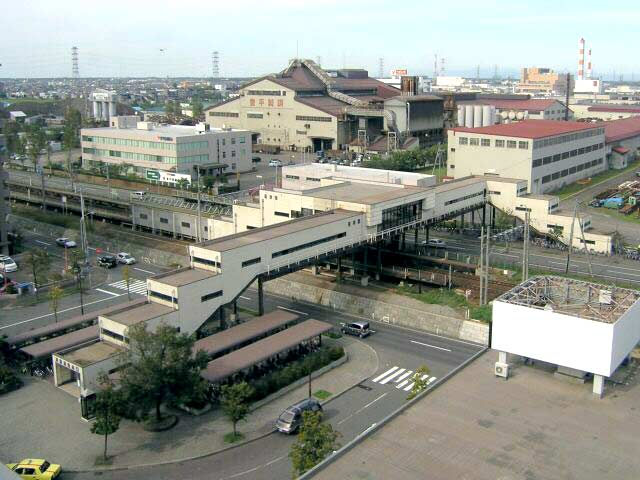
- Hassamu Station, September 2004

General information
- Location: Nishi-ku, Sapporo, Hokkaido; Japan
- Operator: JR Hokkaido
- Line: ■ Hakodate Main Line
- Distance: 279.2 km from Hakodate
- Platforms: 2 side platforms
- Tracks: 2

Other information
- Status: Staffed
- Station code: S05

History
- Opened: 1986

Passengers
- FY2014: 4,426 daily
Location

Hassamu Station (発寒駅, Hassamu-eki) is a railway station in Nishi-ku, Sapporo, Hokkaido, Japan, operated by the Hokkaido Railway Company (JR Hokkaido). The station number is S05.

== Lines ==
Hassamu Station is served by the Hakodate Main Line.

== Station layout ==
The station consists of two ground-level opposed side platforms serving two tracks, with the station situated above the tracks. The station has automated ticket machines, automated turnstiles which accept Kitaca, and a "Midori no Madoguchi" staffed ticket office.

=== Platforms ===
1	■ Hakodate Main Line	for Teine, Otaru, and Kutchan
2	■ Hakodate Main Line	for Sapporo, Iwamizawa, and New Chitose Airport

== Adjacent stations ==
«	Service	»
Hakodate Main Line
Inazumi-Kōen (S06)	Local	Hassamu-Chūō (S04)
Semi-Rapid: Does not stop at this station
Rapid: Does not stop at this station

== Surrounding area ==
- National Route 5, (to Hakodate)
- Sasson Expressway
