= Teine =

Teine may refer to:

- Teine-ku, Sapporo, an administrative district of the city of Sapporo, Hokkaidō, Japan
- Teine Station, a railway station in Teine-ku, Sapporo, Japan
- Sapporo Teine, a ski resort and amusement park in Teine-ku, Sapporo, Japan

== See also ==
- Theine
