= Kotoni (disambiguation) =

Kotoni is a neighborhood in Sapporo, Japan.

Kotoni may also refer to:

== People ==
- Kotoni Ale (born 1990), Tongan rugby union player
- Kotoni Staggs (born 1998), Australian rugby league player

== Other uses ==
- Kotoni Station (disambiguation), train stations in Japan
