= List of highways numbered 5A =

The following highways are numbered 5A:

== Canada ==
- British Columbia Highway 5A

== India ==
- National Highway 5A (India)

== Japan ==
- Sasson Expressway
- Shiribeshi Expressway

== United States ==
- U.S. Route 5A (Massachusetts) (former)
- Florida State Road 5A (Volusia County)
  - Florida State Road 5A (St. Augustine)
  - County Road 5A (Brevard County, Florida)
  - County Road 5A (Broward County, Florida)
  - County Road 5A (Indian River County, Florida)
  - County Road 5A (Martin County, Florida)
- Massachusetts Route 5A (former)
- County Road 5A (Scott County, Minnesota)
- Nevada State Route 5A (former)
- County Route 5A (Monmouth County, New Jersey)
- New York State Route 5A
  - County Route 5A (Allegany County, New York)
  - County Route 5A (Columbia County, New York)
  - County Route 5A (Nassau County, New York)
  - County Route 5A (Schoharie County, New York)
- Oklahoma State Highway 5A
- Vermont Route 5A
