= Shiribeshi (disambiguation) =

Shiribeshi may refer to:

- Shiribeshi Subprefecture
- Shiribeshi Province, a former province in Hokkaido, Japan
- Shiribeshi Expressway, an national expressway in Shiribeshi Subprefecture
