= Hoshioki Station =

Railway station in Sapporo, Japan

Coordinates: 43.1325°N 141.2107°E

Hoshioki Station 星置駅
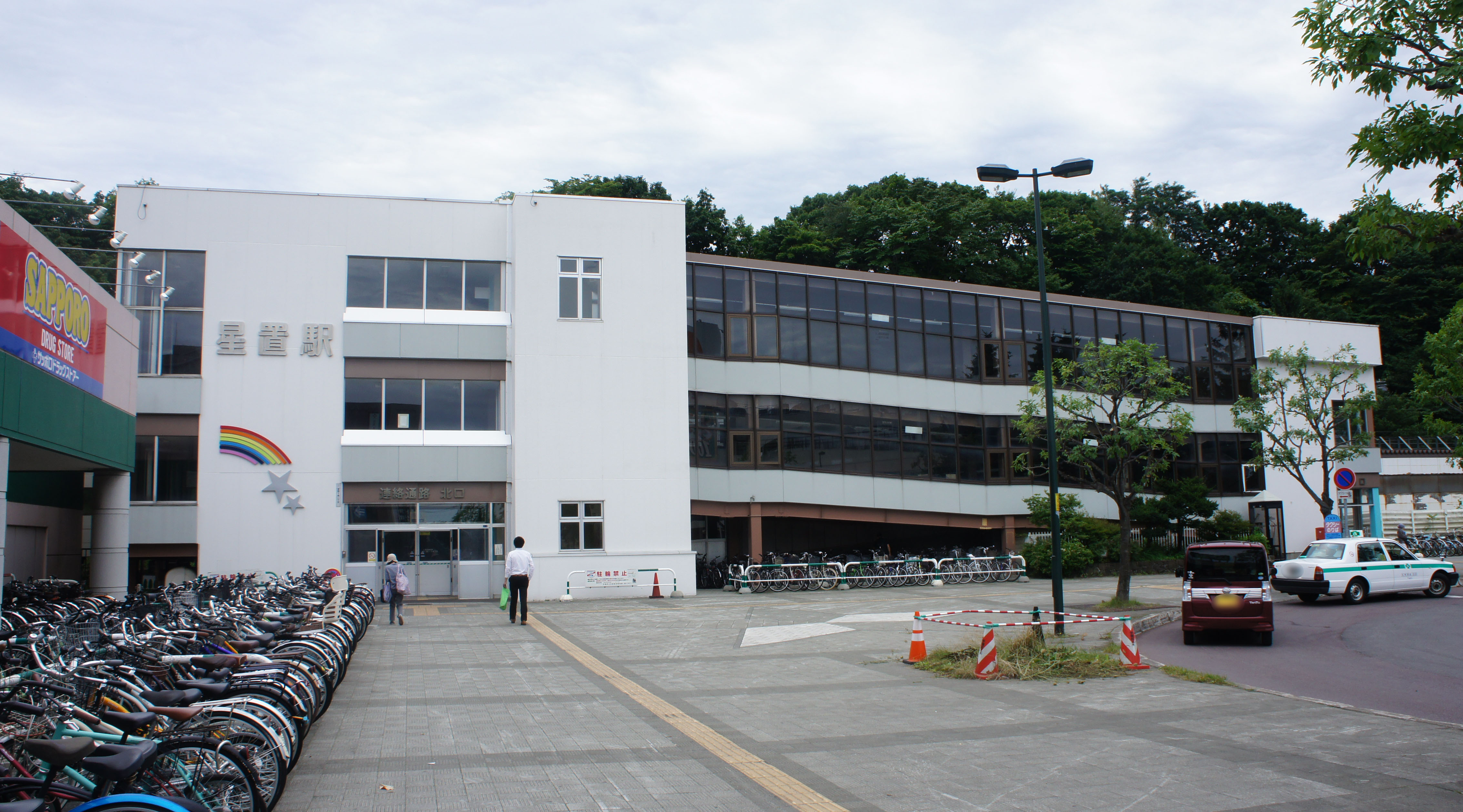
- North side of the station

General information
- Location: Teine, Sapporo, Hokkaido; Japan
- Operator: JR Hokkaido
- Line: ■ Hakodate Main Line
- Distance: 272.6 km from Hakodate
- Platforms: 2 side platforms
- Tracks: 2

Other information
- Status: Staffed
- Station code: S09

History
- Opened: 1985

Passengers
- FY2014: 6,345 daily
Location

Hoshioki Station (星置駅, Hoshioki-eki) is a railway station in Teine-ku, Sapporo, Hokkaidō, Japan, operated by Hokkaido Railway Company (JR Hokkaido).The station is numbered S09.

== Lines ==
Hoshioki Station is served by the Hakodate Main Line.

== Station layout ==
The station consists of two ground-level opposed side platforms serving two tracks, with the station situated above the tracks. The station has automated ticket machines, automated turnstiles which accept Kitaca, and a "Midori no Madoguchi" staffed ticket office.

=== Platforms ===
| 1 | ■ Hakodate Main Line | for Otaru |
| 2 | ■ Hakodate Main Line | for Sapporo, Iwamizawa, and New Chitose Airport |

== Adjacent stations ==
| « | Service | » |
Hakodate Main Line
| Hoshimi (S10) | Semi-Rapid | Inaho (S08) |
| Hoshimi (S10) | Local | Inaho (S08) |
Rapid: Does not stop at this station

== Layout ==
- Japan National Route 5 (to Hakodate)
- Emori Memorial Hoshioki Ice Skating Rink
- Otome Waterfall
- Hoshioki Waterfall
- Joy Supermarket
- Ronald McDonald House Charities, Sapporo
- Hokkaido Teine Nursing School
- Pastoral Hoshioki Shopping Mall
- Fashion Mall Hoshioki
- Hokuyu Lucky Supermarket
- CO-OP Sapporo, Hoshioki branch
- Teine Hoshioki Police Station
- Teine Hoshioki Station Post Office
- North Pacific Bank, Shin-Hoshioki branch
- Hokkaido Bank, Hoshioki branch
