= Yunokawa Onsen =

Yunokawa Onsen may refer to:

- Yunokawa Onsen (Hokkaido), located in Hakodate, Hokkaidō Prefecture, Japan
- Yunokawa Onsen (Shimane), located in Izumo, Shimane Prefecture, Japan
