= Zenibako River =

River in Hokkaidō, Japan

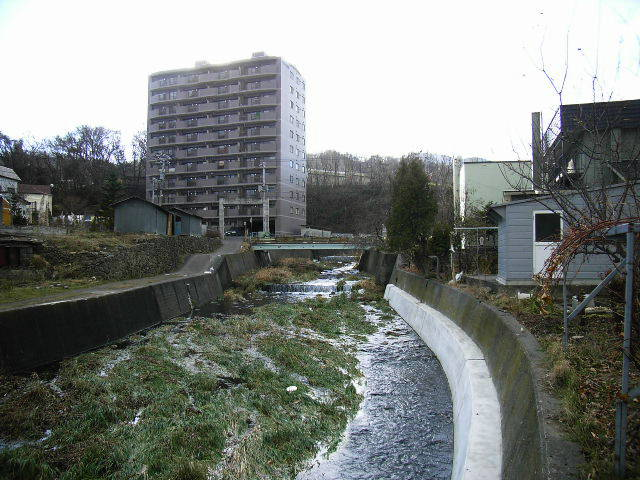
- The river going through town

- Location within Japan

Location
- Countries: Japan
- Prefecture: Hokkaido

Physical characteristics
- Source
  - location: north of Mount Okuteine
- Mouth
  - location: Sea of Japan
  - coordinates: 43°08′39″N 141°09′32″E

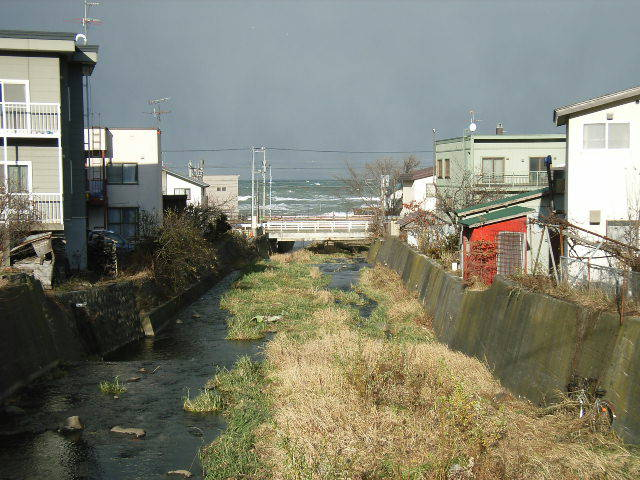
River mouth at the Sea of Japan (2004)

The Zenibako River (銭函川) runs from Otaru, Hokkaido, Japan and ends in the Sea of Japan. It is a Normal Class River of the Zenibako River System under Japanese River Law.

The Zenibako River originates north of Mount Okuteine, near the border with Sapporo City. It runs through mountain woods and meets the Zenibako-tōge River (銭函峠川) as it emerges from the Zenibako Mountain Pass (銭函峠, Zenibako Tōge). Katsuraoka-machi (桂岡町, Katsuraoka Town) is situated around the left bank of its middle course. The river turns eastward where it passes under the Sasson Expressway and National Route 5. It runs through the urban area of Zenibako, turns north, then enters the Ishikari Bay 200 meters southwest of Zenibako Station. The course lower than Route 5 was consolidated with concrete after the 1962 flood.

Biochemical oxygen demand of the water in 2004 was 0.1 mg/L, which means good condition. Water of the upper stream is utilized by the Zenibako Purification Plant in Katsuraoka-machi for the east part of Otaru City's water service. Water hardness of Zenibako is 29 mg/L.

== Bridges ==
- - Sasson Expressway
- Zenibako Bridge (銭函橋) - Japan National Route 5
- Naka-no-hashi or Naka-no Bridge (仲の橋)
- Sawa-no-hashi or Sawa-no Bridge (沢の橋)
- Zenibako Shimo-no-hashi or Zenibako Shimo-no Bridge (銭函下の橋)
- - Hakodate Main Line
- Zenibako Bridge (銭函橋) - Hokkaidō Prefectural Highway 225, Otaru-Ishikari Line.
