= Hassamu-Chūō Station =

Railway station in Sapporo, Japan

Coordinates: 43.0889°N 141.2946°E

Hassamu-Chūō Station 発寒中央駅
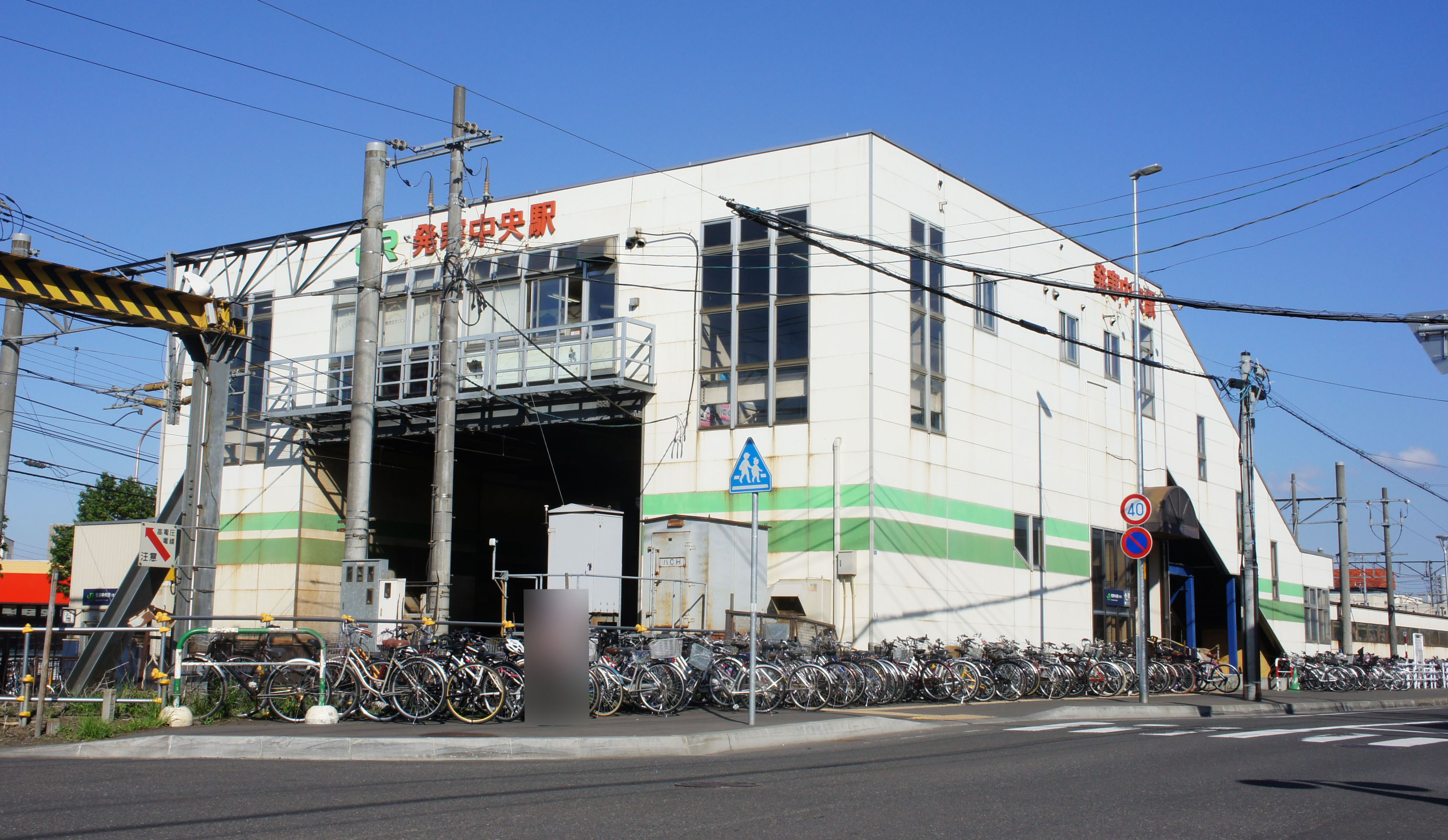
- Station Building

General information
- Location: Nishi-ku, Sapporo, Hokkaido; Japan
- Operator: JR Hokkaido
- Line: ■ Hakodate Main Line
- Distance: 281.0 km from Hakodate
- Platforms: 2 side platforms
- Tracks: 2

Other information
- Status: Staffed
- Station code: S04

History
- Opened: 1986

Passengers
- FY2014: 4,006 daily
Location

Hassamu-Chūō Station (発寒中央駅, Hassamu-Chūō-eki) is a railway station in Nishi-ku, Sapporo, Hokkaidō, Japan, operated by the Hokkaido Railway Company (JR Hokkaido). The station is numbered S04.

== Lines ==
Hassamu-Chūō Station is served by the Hakodate Main Line.

== Station layout ==
The station consists of two ground-level opposed side platforms serving two tracks, with the station situated above the tracks. The station has automated ticket machines, automated turnstiles which accept Kitaca, a "Midori no Madoguchi" staffed ticket office, and drink vending machines.

=== Platforms ===
1	■ Hakodate Main Line	for Teine, Otaru, and Kutchan
2	■ Hakodate Main Line	for Sapporo, Iwamizawa, and New Chitose Airport

== Adjacent stations ==
«	Service	»
Hakodate Main Line
Semi-Rapid: Does not stop at this station
Rapid: Does not stop at this station
Hassamu (S05)	Local	Kotoni (S03)

== Surrounding area ==
- Subway Hassamu-Minami Station (Tōzai Line)
