= Inaho Station =

Railway station in Sapporo, Japan

Coordinates: 43.1278°N 141.2223°E

Inaho Station 稲穂駅
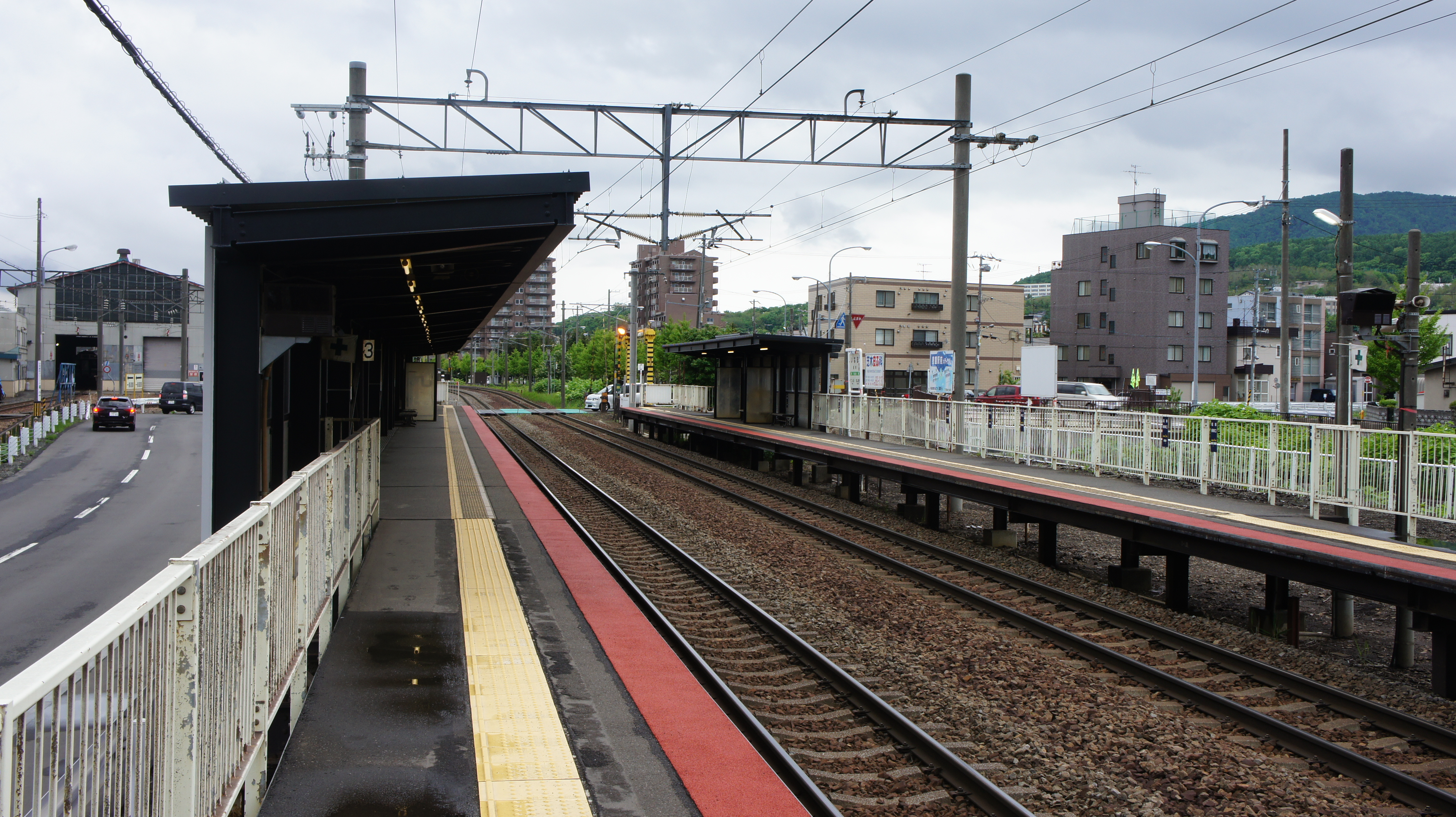

General information
- Location: Teine-ku, Sapporo, Hokkaido; Japan
- Operator: JR Hokkaido
- Line: ■ Hakodate Main Line
- Distance: 273.7 km from Hakodate
- Platforms: 2 side platforms
- Tracks: 2

Other information
- Status: Unstaffed
- Station code: S08

History
- Opened: 1986

Passengers
- FY2014: 860 daily
Location
- Location within Japan

Inaho Station (稲穂駅, Inaho-eki) is a railway station on the Hakodate Main Line in Teine-ku, Sapporo, Hokkaido, Japan, operated by Hokkaido Railway Company (JR Hokkaido). The station is numbered "S08".

== Lines ==
Inaho Station is served by the Hakodate Main Line.

== Station layout ==
The station consists of two ground-level opposed side platforms serving two tracks. The station has automated ticket machines and Kitaca card readers (not equipped with regular ticket gates). The station is unattended.

=== Platforms ===
1	■ Hakodate Main Line	for Otaru
2	■ Hakodate Main Line	for Sapporo, Iwamizawa, and New Chitose Airport

== Adjacent stations ==
«	Service	»
Hakodate Main Line
Hoshioki (S09)	Semi-Rapid	Teine (S07)
Hoshioki (S09)	Local	Teine (S07)
Rapid: Does not stop at this station

== Surrounding area ==
- National Route 5, (to Hakodate)
- JR Hokkaido Sapporo Operation Office
- Sapporo Driver's License Examination Hall
- Inaho Teine Police Station
- Inaho Teine Postal Office
- Teine Industrial-Park
- JR Bus Hokkaido, Teine Office
