= Hoshimi Station =

Railway station in Sapporo, Japan

Hoshimi Station ほしみ駅
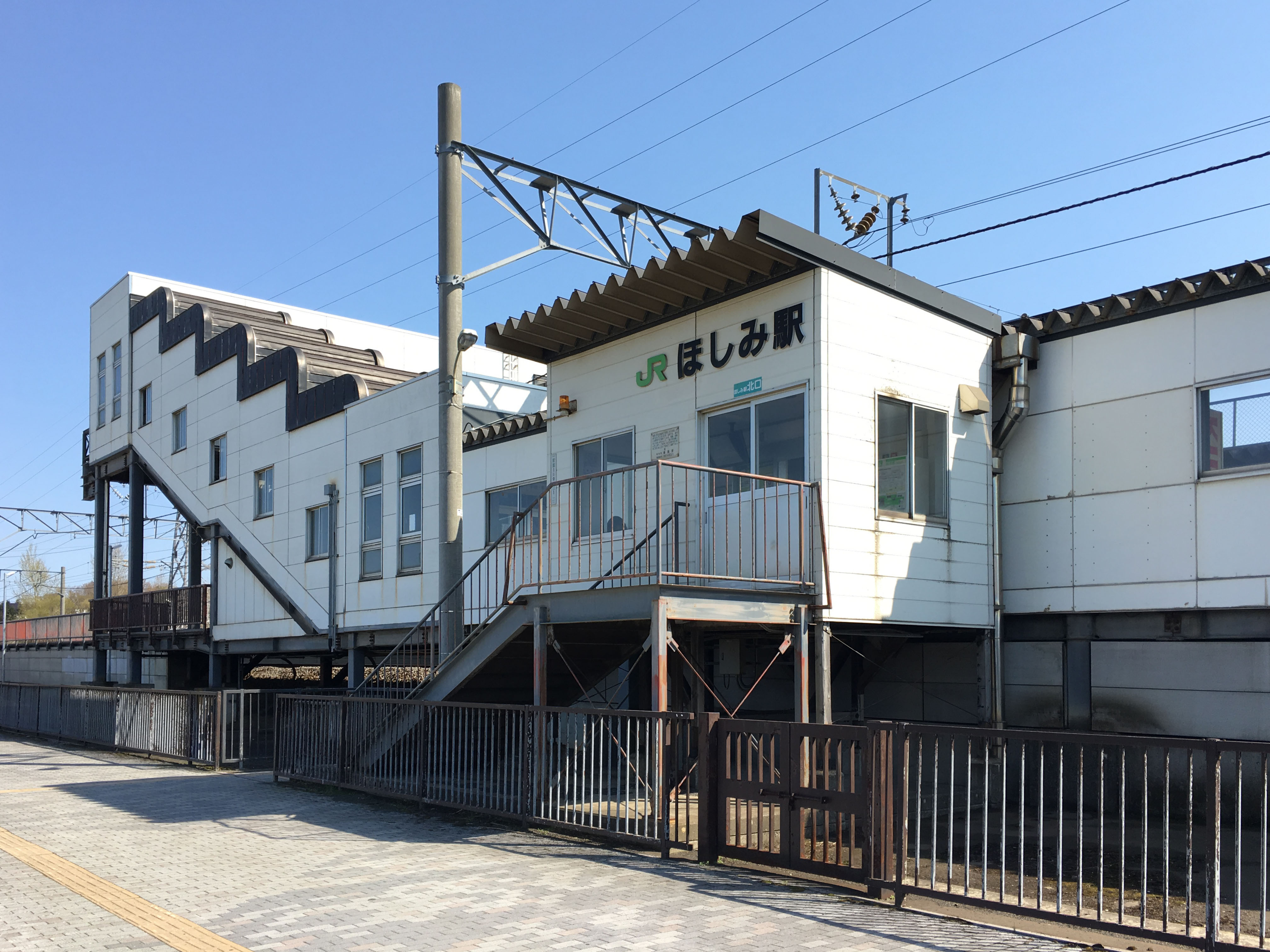
- The north entrance in May 2017

General information
- Location: Teine-ku, Sapporo, Hokkaido; Japan
- Coordinates: 43.1339°N 141.1916°E
- Operator: JR Hokkaido
- Line: ■ Hakodate Main Line
- Distance: 271.0 km from Hakodate
- Platforms: 2 side platforms
- Tracks: 2

Other information
- Status: Unstaffed
- Station code: S10

History
- Opened: 16 March 1995
Location
- Location within Hokkaido Location within Japan

Hoshimi Station (ほしみ駅, Hoshimi-eki) is a railway station on the Hakodate Main Line in Teine-ku, Sapporo, Hokkaido, Japan, operated by the Hokkaido Railway Company (JR Hokkaido).

== Lines ==
Hoshimi Station is served by the Hakodate Main Line, and is numbered "S10".

== Station layout ==
The station consists of two ground-level opposed side platforms serving two tracks. The station has automated ticket machines and Kitaca card readers (not equipped with regular ticket gates). The station is unattended.

=== Platforms ===
1	■ Hakodate Main Line	for Otaru
2	■ Hakodate Main Line	for Sapporo, Iwamizawa, and New Chitose Airport

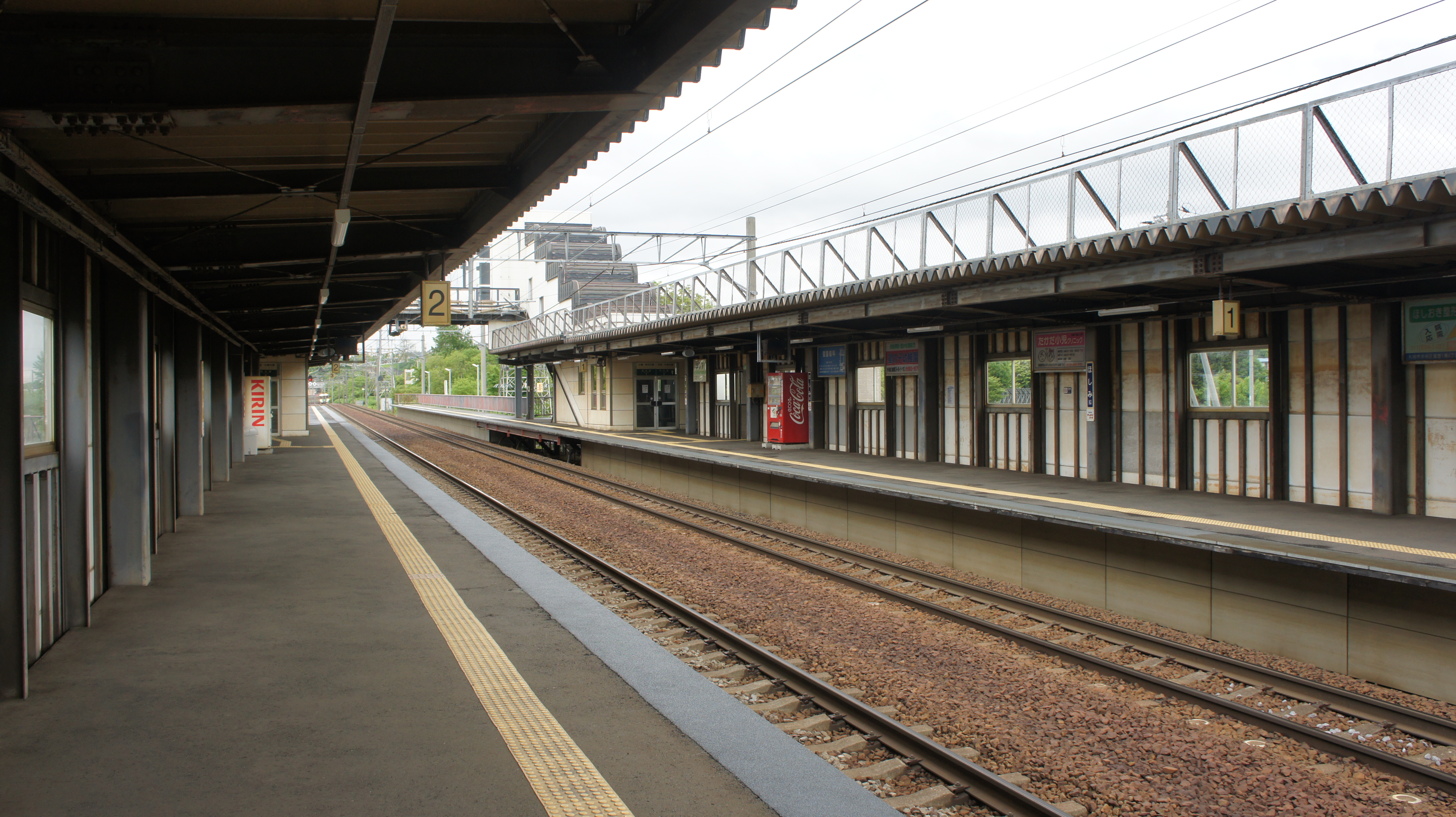
The platforms in May 2017

== Adjacent stations ==
«	Service	»
Hakodate Main Line
Rapid: Does not stop at this station
Zenibako (S11)	Local	Hoshioki (S09)

== History ==
The station opened on 16 March 1995. Hoshi in Japanese means 'star' and mi is 'looking' in English, so Hoshimi means 'Looking at stars'. It was named after the Hoshimi Bridge, which cross the Hoshioki River.

== Surrounding area ==
The station is situated near the municipality border between Sapporo and Otaru. The small port town Zenibako sits on the Otaru side and there are some factories on the border. To the south of the station, National Route 5 runs connecting Sapporo, Zenibako, and Otaru.

- National Route 5 (to Hakodate)
- National Route 337 (to Otaru)
- Teinehoshioki Post Office
- Nippon COMSYS (communications holding), Hokkaido Branch

== See also ==
- List of railway stations in Japan
