= Adalhat =

Adalhat Ibrahimpur
- Suburbs
- Location within Uttar Pradesh Location within India
- Coordinates: 25.282°N 82.9563°E
- Country: India
- State: Uttar Pradesh
- District: Mirzapur
- Founder: Baba Adalshah

Area
  - Total: 44 km^{2} (17 sq mi)
- Elevation: 80.71 m (264.8 ft)

Population (2011)
  - Total: 22,194

Languages
  - Official: Hindi, English, Urdu
- Time zone: UTC+5:30 (IST)
- PIN: 231302
- Telephone code: 05443
- Vehicle registration: UP 63
- Sex ratio: 0.926 (2011) ♂/♀
- Literacy: 77.05 (2011)%

Adalhat, now a rising rural market place, was a small village located in Mirzapur district of Uttar Pradesh state in northern India. Its name is derived from famous Sufi saint Adalshah Baba, whose Majar is still maintained in vill. Ibrahimpur, which is a cent percent Hindu village. Adalhat is located on SH 5A, also known as Shakti Nagar Highway, being upgraded from two lane to four lane, it has Varanasi in its north at a distance of 30 km and Robertsganj in south at a distance of 60 km. Legal administration of the place lies with Chunar Tahsil.

Adalhat is not a revenue village, so not on all administrative records, but it comprises villages Ibrahimpur, Naithi, Hansapur, Garaundi, and Pathraura of Tahsil Chunar. It has police station and post office in name of Adalhat. About 50 years ago this place was confined to village Ibrahimpur only. There was only one primary school for about a dozen villages, nearby till 1951.

A social worker and Sarpanch of this area Sri Sita Ram Gupta took initiative and a middle school was started in 1951 which gradually rose up to 10+2 standard now and named as Adarsh Inter College. The college is co-educational with about 3000 students and about an equal number of girls and boys. The connectivity by canal service roads and Sharma Road extended up to Bihar in east and being on main Varanasi-Shaktinagar road, opened doors to good business. There is a post graduate level government-run degree college for women Lalta Singh Rajkiya Mahila Mahavidyalaya. The strength of girls in this college is about 1500.

There are three nationalised banks (Union Bank, State bank of India Bank and Allahabad Bank), one cooperative bank and A post-office branch in Adalhat market. This is not a big business center but its proximity to Varanasi (30 km) and being a hub of agricultural activities has a good potential for a food processing unit. Adalhat is also known for its most secular image. On the eve of Moharram every year, more than hundred Tazias are brought here from nearby villages for burial at Garaundi Imambara. They proceed from the northern end of Adalhat market in shape of a procession, which is led by Tazia of Ibrahimpur where only a couple citizens having faith in Islam live. In this village (Ibrahimpur) Hindus fully cooperate for this Tazia and the following events.

The place has also been in news for revamping education system in rural India, many schools like Royal Public school, Eden school, Kalidasa have transformed the education system in the area covering approximately 50 km. Some coaching institutes like Gyanoday Institute of Computer & Technology, BASE School of Spoken English, Advance Coaching centre, RB Singh Coaching Centre & Mishra Coaching Centre and private primary school like Swami Vivekanand Adarsh Baal Vidyalaya (founded by Ramesh Pandey), Kalidas public School (founded by Kalicharan Gupta), Gyanoday Public School (founded by Abhijeet Srivastava), etc.

This place is located on Varanasi-Shaktinagar highway, nearest railway station being Ahraura Road (at Narayanpur). The place is famous for its nearby (20 km) waterfall, Lakhania dari.

== Climate ==
Adalhat experiences a humid subtropical climate (Köppen climate classification Cwa) with large variations between summer and winter temperatures. Summers are long, from early April to October, with intervening monsoon seasons and are also extremely hot, even by South Asian standards. The temperature ranges between 22°C – 46 °C (72°F – 115 °F) in the summers. Winters in this place see very large diurnal variations, with warm days and downright cold nights. Cold waves from the Himalayan region cause temperatures to dip across the city in the winter from December to February and temperatures below 5 °C are not uncommon. The average annual rainfall is 1,110 mm (44 in). Fog is common in the winters, while hot dry winds, called loo, blow in the summers.

Through a combination of water pollution, new constructions of upstream dams, and increase in the local temperature, the water level of the Ganges has recently gone down significantly, and small islands have become visible in the middle of the river.

== Events ==
- Durgapuja Celebration
- Holi Milan Samaroh
- Diwali

17 May 2012 was the hottest day of the season so far with mercury soaring up to 45.6 °C.

Climate data for Adalhat
Month	Jan	Feb	Mar	Apr	May	Jun	Jul	Aug	Sep	Oct	Nov	Dec	Year
Mean daily maximum °C (°F)	19 (67)	24 (76)	31 (87)	37 (98)	38 (100)	36 (97)	32 (90)	31 (88)	31 (88)	31 (87)	27 (81)	22 (71)	30 (86)
Mean daily minimum °C (°F)	8 (47)	12 (54)	17 (62)	22 (72)	25 (77)	27 (80)	26 (78)	26 (78)	24 (76)	21 (70)	15 (59)	11 (51)	20 (67)
Average precipitation mm (inches)	19.3 (0.76)	13.5 (0.53)	10.4 (0.41)	5.4 (0.21)	9.0 (0.35)	100.0 (3.94)	320.6 (12.62)	260.4 (10.25)	231.6 (9.12)	38.3 (1.51)	12.9 (0.51)	4.0 (0.16)	1,025.4 (40.37)
