= Kotoni Station =

Kotoni Station is the name of two train stations in Sapporo, Japan:

- Kotoni Station (JR Hokkaido)
- Kotoni Station (Sapporo Municipal Subway)
