= Kotoni =

Neighborhood in Sapporo, Japan

Kotoni (Japanese: 琴似) is a neighborhood in Sapporo, Japan. It is one of many neighborhoods that make up the West Ward of Sapporo. It is primarily a residential and commercial area, with businesses such as department stores, convenience stores, restaurants, and laundromats lining the major streets and apartment buildings and houses on the side streets. The Sapporo Municipal Subway is accessible through Kotoni Station, with access to the Tōzai Line. Kotoni also has direct access to the Hakodate Main Line through another train station, also called Kotoni Station.
