= Teine-ku =

Coordinates: 43°7′19″N 141°14′44″E

Teine 手稲区
- Ward
- Teine Ward
- Flag Seal

- Location of Teine-ku in Sapporo
- Country: Japan
- Prefecture: Hokkaidō
- City: Sapporo
- Established: November 6, 1989

Area
  - Total: 56.77 km^{2} (21.92 sq mi)

Population (2014)
  - Total: 141,291
  - Density: 2,489/km^{2} (6,446/sq mi)
- Estimation as of December 31, 2014
- Time zone: UTC+9 (Japan Standard Time)
- Postal: 006-8612
- Address: 11-1-10 Maedaichijo, Teine-ku, Sapporo-shi, Hokkaido
- Climate: Dfb
- Website: Teine-ku Ward Office

Teine-ku (手稲区) is one of the 10 wards in Sapporo, Hokkaidō, Japan. The ward is located in northwest of Sapporo, which is neighboured to three other wards in Sapporo and two cities. The area was established as one of the wards in Sapporo in 1989, when it was split from Nishi-ku, Sapporo.

== Overview ==
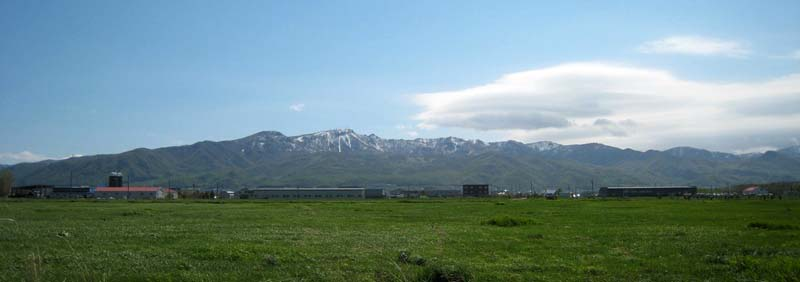
Mount Teine

According to the jūminhyō (registry of current residential addresses and figures) in 2008, 138,570 people are living in Teine-ku. The total area of the ward is 56.92 km^{2}, which is the 6th largest ward in Sapporo. Surrounded by a rich natural environment, Teine-ku has a number of mountain ranges and rivers including Mount Teine, whose height is 1,023.7 metres.

It is adjacent to three other wards in Sapporo: Kita-ku, Nishi-ku, and Minami-ku, and two cities: Ishikari, and Otaru.

The name Teine is derived of a word "teyne-i" in Ainu language, which means a "marsh" or "wet place". It is currently written as "手稲" in kanji, which is respectively translated as "hand" for "手" and "rice plant" for "稲".

== History ==
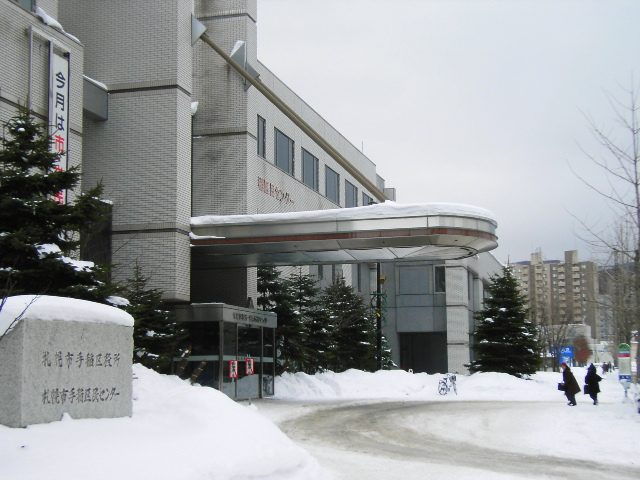
Teine-ku, ward office.

In 1872, Teine Village was established after being split from Hassamu Village. The village was later divided into two villages (Kami-Teine village and Shimo-Teine village) in 1874. The Garuishi Kidō, a Horsecar company, has established and laid horsecar line, which was abolished in 1940.

The area was reorganized as Teine Town in 1951. It was merged into Sapporo City in 1967, and also merged into Nishi-ku in 1972, when Sapporo was listed as one of the cities designated by government ordinance. In 1989, Teine-ku was established after being split from Nishi-ku.

== Geography ==
=== Climate ===
Climate data for Teine-ku, Sapporo (1991−2020 normals, extremes 1977−present)
Month	Jan	Feb	Mar	Apr	May	Jun	Jul	Aug	Sep	Oct	Nov	Dec	Year
Record high °C (°F)	9.3 (48.7)	10.7 (51.3)	17.9 (64.2)	29.2 (84.6)	33.5 (92.3)	33.3 (91.9)	37.1 (98.8)	36.0 (96.8)	33.8 (92.8)	27.3 (81.1)	22.4 (72.3)	15.0 (59.0)	37.1 (98.8)
Mean daily maximum °C (°F)	−0.4 (31.3)	0.2 (32.4)	4.0 (39.2)	11.3 (52.3)	17.7 (63.9)	21.5 (70.7)	25.1 (77.2)	26.3 (79.3)	22.9 (73.2)	16.5 (61.7)	8.8 (47.8)	1.9 (35.4)	13.0 (55.4)
Daily mean °C (°F)	−3.7 (25.3)	−3.3 (26.1)	0.4 (32.7)	6.5 (43.7)	12.2 (54.0)	16.2 (61.2)	20.3 (68.5)	21.6 (70.9)	17.8 (64.0)	11.4 (52.5)	4.7 (40.5)	−1.3 (29.7)	8.6 (47.4)
Mean daily minimum °C (°F)	−7.7 (18.1)	−7.7 (18.1)	−3.8 (25.2)	1.6 (34.9)	7.1 (44.8)	11.9 (53.4)	16.4 (61.5)	17.5 (63.5)	12.8 (55.0)	6.1 (43.0)	0.5 (32.9)	−5.0 (23.0)	4.1 (39.4)
Record low °C (°F)	−20.9 (−5.6)	−20.3 (−4.5)	−17.6 (0.3)	−9.7 (14.5)	−1.5 (29.3)	0.9 (33.6)	7.2 (45.0)	8.2 (46.8)	1.8 (35.2)	−2.7 (27.1)	−9.9 (14.2)	−16.7 (1.9)	−20.9 (−5.6)
Average precipitation mm (inches)	84.9 (3.34)	66.5 (2.62)	53.4 (2.10)	46.7 (1.84)	51.9 (2.04)	52.1 (2.05)	86.3 (3.40)	122.0 (4.80)	131.8 (5.19)	101.8 (4.01)	107.4 (4.23)	93.3 (3.67)	998.0 (39.29)
Average precipitation days (≥ 1.0 mm)	18.5	15.0	13.0	8.9	8.9	8.1	8.4	9.9	10.7	12.8	15.9	17.0	147.1
Mean monthly sunshine hours	78.9	88.6	144.2	181.3	195.3	165.5	161.6	171.1	162.8	142.9	94.3	76.7	1,668.1
Source: Japan Meteorological Agency

== Education ==
=== Universities ===
- Hokkaido University of Science
- Hokkaido College of Pharmacy

=== College ===
- Hokkaido Automotive Engineering College

=== High schools ===
- Hokkaido Sapporo Teine High School
- Hokkaido Sapporo Touun High School
- Hokkaido Sapporo Asukaze High School

== Transportation ==
- Hakodate Main Line: Hoshimi - Hoshioki - Inaho - Teine - Inazumi-Kōen
- Sasson Expressway: Sapporo-nishi IC - Teine IC - Kanayama PA
- Route 5

== 1972 Winter Olympics ==
The 1972 Winter Olympics were held in Sapporo, and Mount Teine hosted the alpine skiing (giant slalom and slalom only), bobsleigh, and luge events.

== Mascot ==
Teinu, the ward's mascot

Teine's mascot is Teinu-kun (ていぬ君) who is a mixed dog/polar bear/rabbit kamuy. As a result, it had five ears that resembled fingers. It resides in a special room in the ward office. It is accidentally discovered at Mt. Teine on November 6, 1989 when it smelled alcohol. It likes pumpkins, watermelons and cream bread (which give its nose its colour). It struggles to control with its body temperature. It is still learning the human language.
