= Inazumi-Kōen Station =

Railway station in Sapporo, Japan

Coordinates: 43.1121°N 141.2571°E

Inazumi-Kōen Station 稲積公園駅
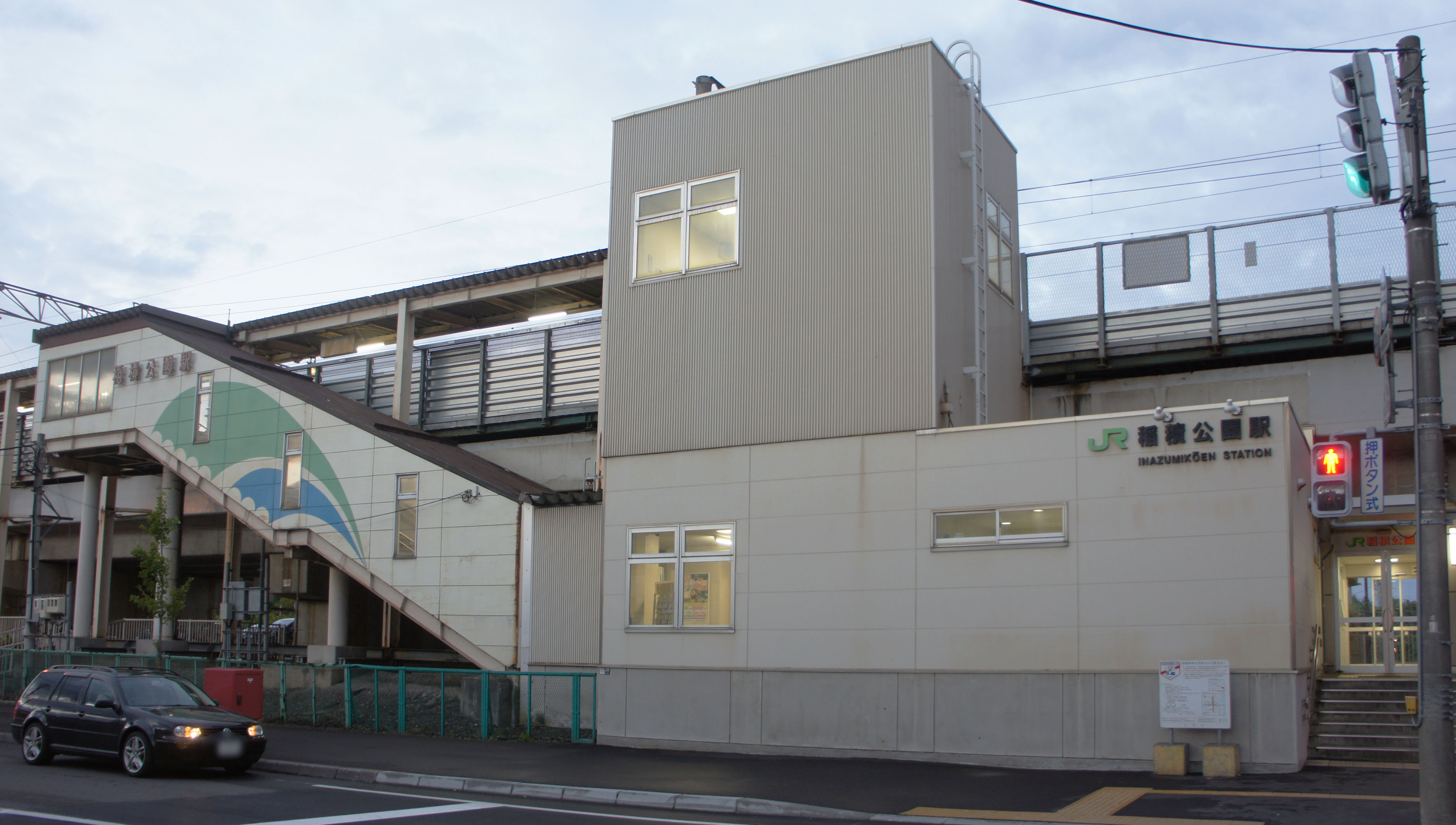
- Inazumi-Kōen Station, October 2018

General information
- Location: Teine, Sapporo, Hokkaido; Japan
- Operator: JR Hokkaido
- Line: ■ Hakodate Main Line
- Distance: 277.0 km from Hakodate
- Platforms: 2 side platforms
- Tracks: 2

Other information
- Status: Staffed
- Station code: S06

History
- Opened: 1986

Passengers
- FY2014: 4,828 daily
Location

Inazumi-Kōen Station (稲積公園駅, Inazumi-Kōen-eki) is a railway station in Teine-ku, Sapporo, Hokkaido, Japan, operated by Hokkaido Railway Company (JR Hokkaido). The station is numbered S06.

== Lines ==
Inazumi-Kōen Station is served by the Hakodate Main Line.

== Station layout ==
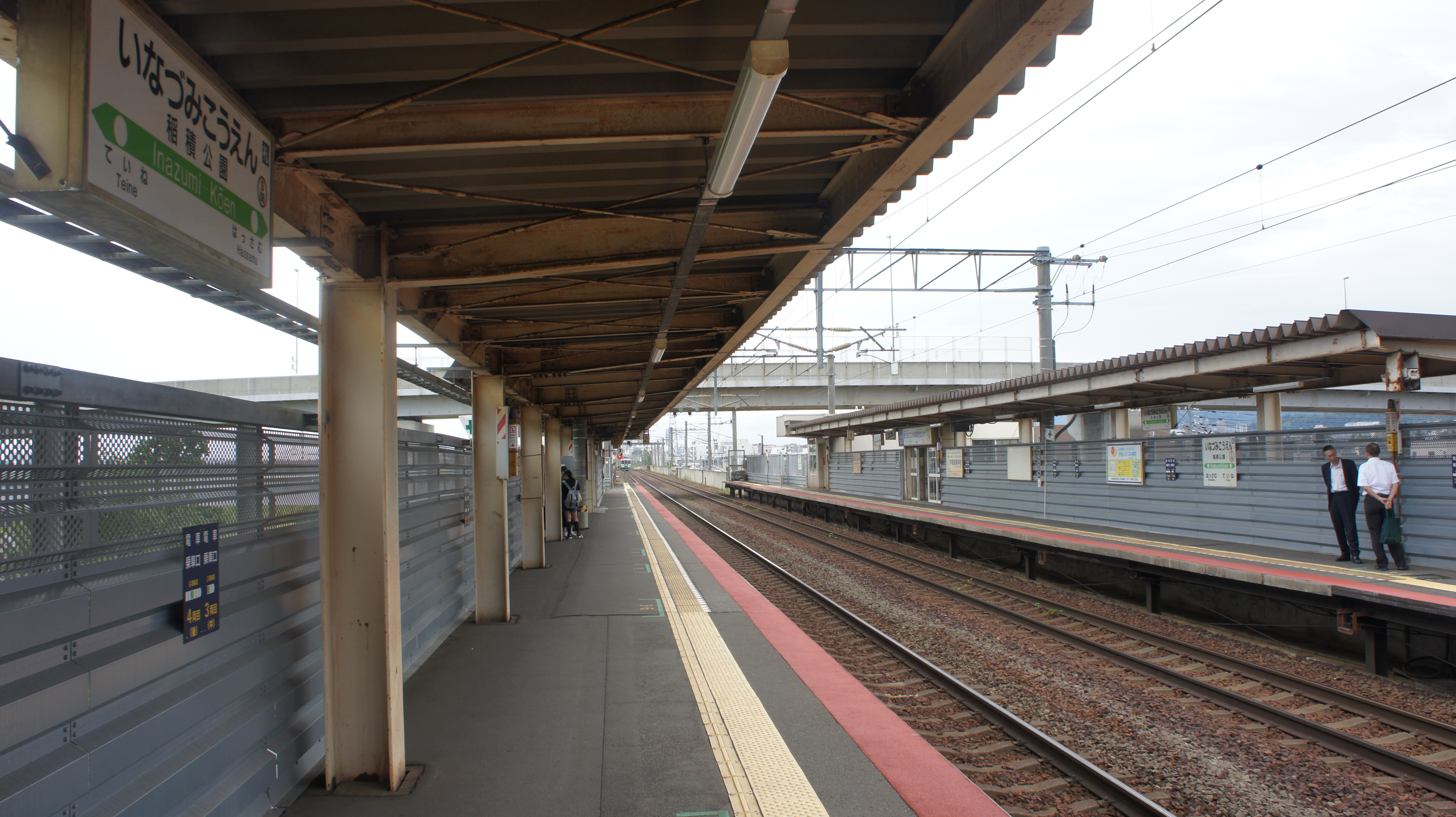
Platform, August 2018

The station consists of two elevated opposed side platforms serving two tracks. The station has automated ticket machines, automated turnstiles which accept Kitaca, and a "Midori no Madoguchi" staffed ticket office.

=== Platforms ===
1	■ Hakodate Main Line	for Teine, Otaru, and Kutchan
2	■ Hakodate Main Line	for Sapporo, Iwamizawa, and Shin-Chitose-Kuko

== Adjacent stations ==
«	Service	»
Hakodate Main Line
Teine (S07)	Local	Hassamu (S05)
Semi-Rapid: Does not stop at this station
Rapid: Does not stop at this station

== Surrounding area ==
- Teine Police Station
- Inazumi Teine Post Office
- Teine Inazumi Park
- Teine Swimming Pool
