= Zenibako Station =

Railway station in Otaru, Hokkaido, Japan

Coordinates: 43.1432°N 141.1596°E

Zenibako Station 銭函駅
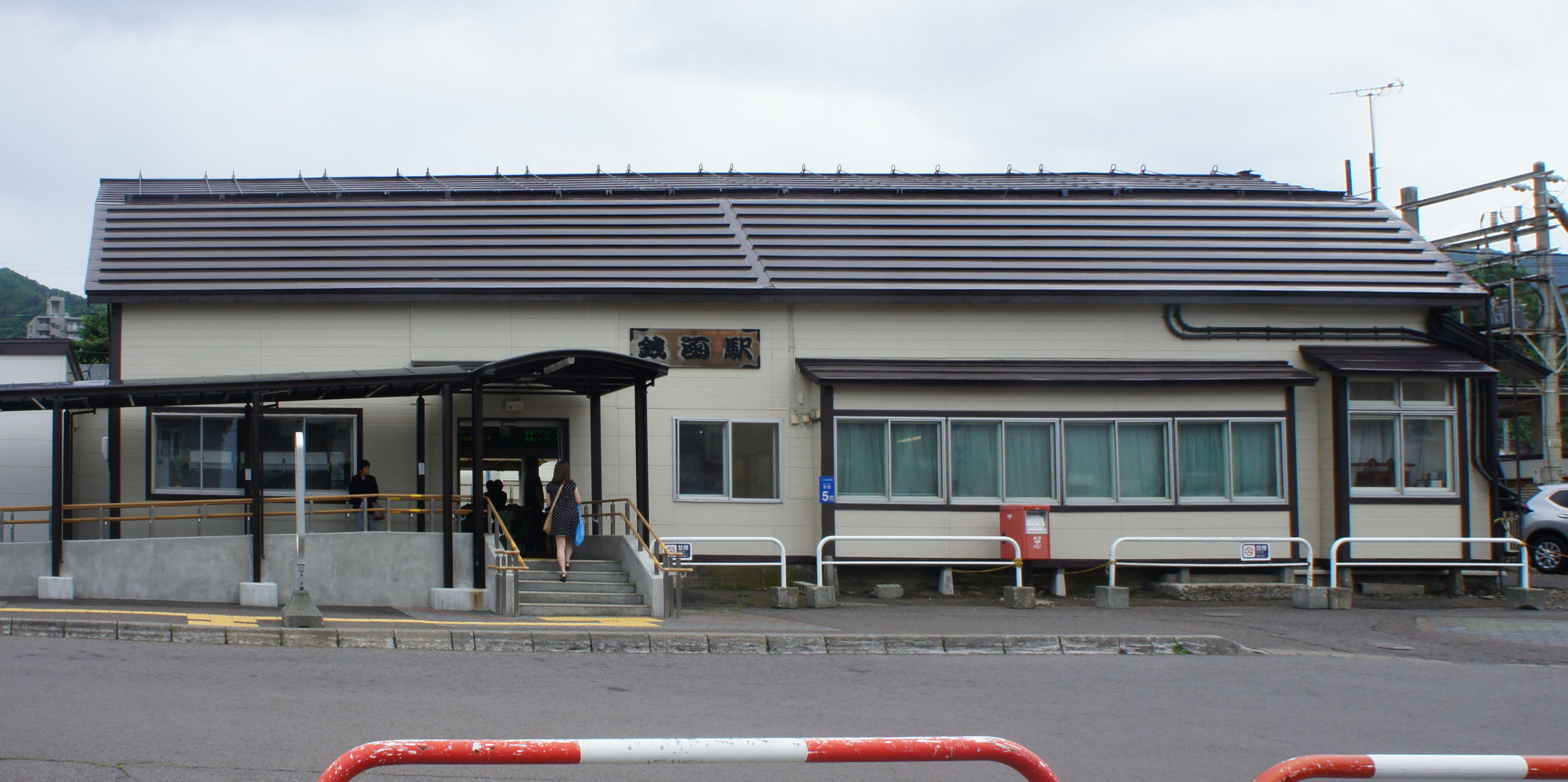
- The north side of Zenibako Station in August 2018

General information
- Location: Otaru, Hokkaido; Japan
- Operator: JR Hokkaido
- Line: ■ Hakodate Main Line
- Distance: 268.1 km from Hakodate
- Platforms: 2 side platforms
- Tracks: 2

Other information
- Status: Staffed
- Station code: S11

History
- Opened: 1880

Passengers
- FY2014: 2,663 daily
Location
- Location within Japan

Zenibako Station (銭函駅, Zenibako-eki) is a railway station on the Hakodate Main Line in Otaru, Hokkaido, Japan, operated by Hokkaido Railway Company (JR Hokkaido). The station is numbered "S11".

== Lines ==
Zenibako Station is served by the Hakodate Main Line.

== Station layout ==
The station consists of two ground-level opposed side platforms connected by a footbridge, serving two tracks. The station has automated ticket machines, automated turnstiles which accept Kitaca, and a "Midori no Madoguchi" staffed ticket office.

=== Platforms ===
1	■ Hakodate Main Line	for Otaru
3	■ Hakodate Main Line	for Sapporo, Iwamizawa, and New Chitose Airport

== Adjacent stations ==
«	Service	»
Hakodate Main Line
Asari (S12)	Semi-Rapid	Hoshimi (S10)
Rapid: Does not stop at this station
Asari (S12)	Local	Hoshimi (S10)

== Surrounding area ==
The Zenibako River enters to the Ishikari Bay 200 meters southwest of the station.

== See also ==
- List of railway stations in Japan
