= Japan National Route 229 =

Road in Hokkaido, Japan

National Route 229
- 国道229号
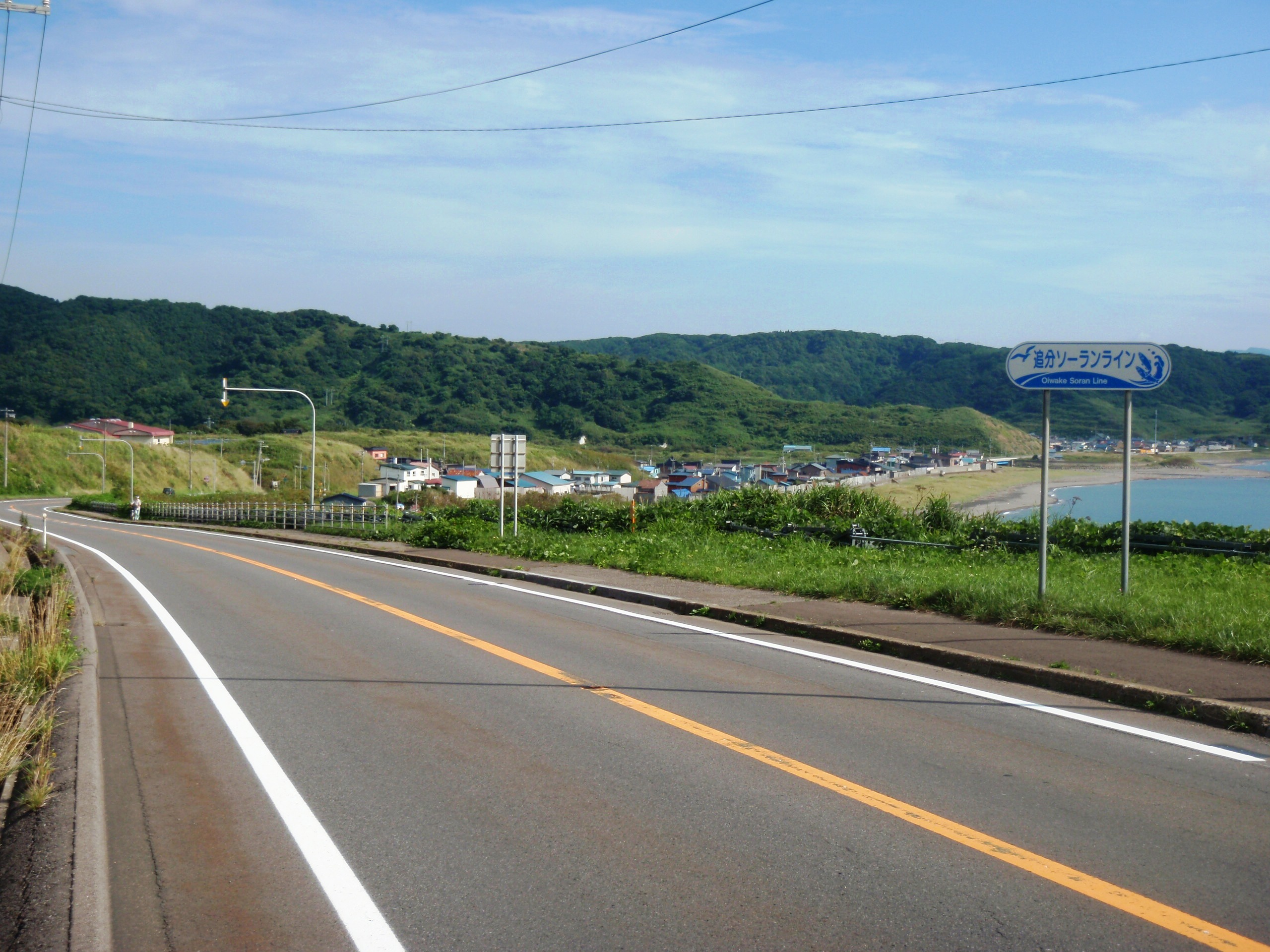

Route information
- Length: 307.0 km (190.8 mi)
- Existed: 1953–present

Location
- Country: Japan

Highway system
- National highways of Japan; Expressways of Japan
← National Route 228	→ National Route 230

National Route 229 is a national highway of Japan connecting Otaru, Hokkaido and Esashi, Hokkaido in Japan, with a total length of 307 km (190.76 mi).
