= Hokkaido Automotive Engineering College =

Coordinates: 43°1′45.6″N 141°21′37.2″E

Hokkaido Automotive Engineering College (北海道自動車短期大学, Hokkaidō jidōsha tanki daigaku) is a private junior college in Sapporo, Hokkaido, Japan, established in 1953. It was closed in 2022.
