= Yunokawa Onsen (Hokkaido) =

Thermal spring in Hokkaido Prefecture, Japan

Coordinates: 41.77875°N 140.78258°E

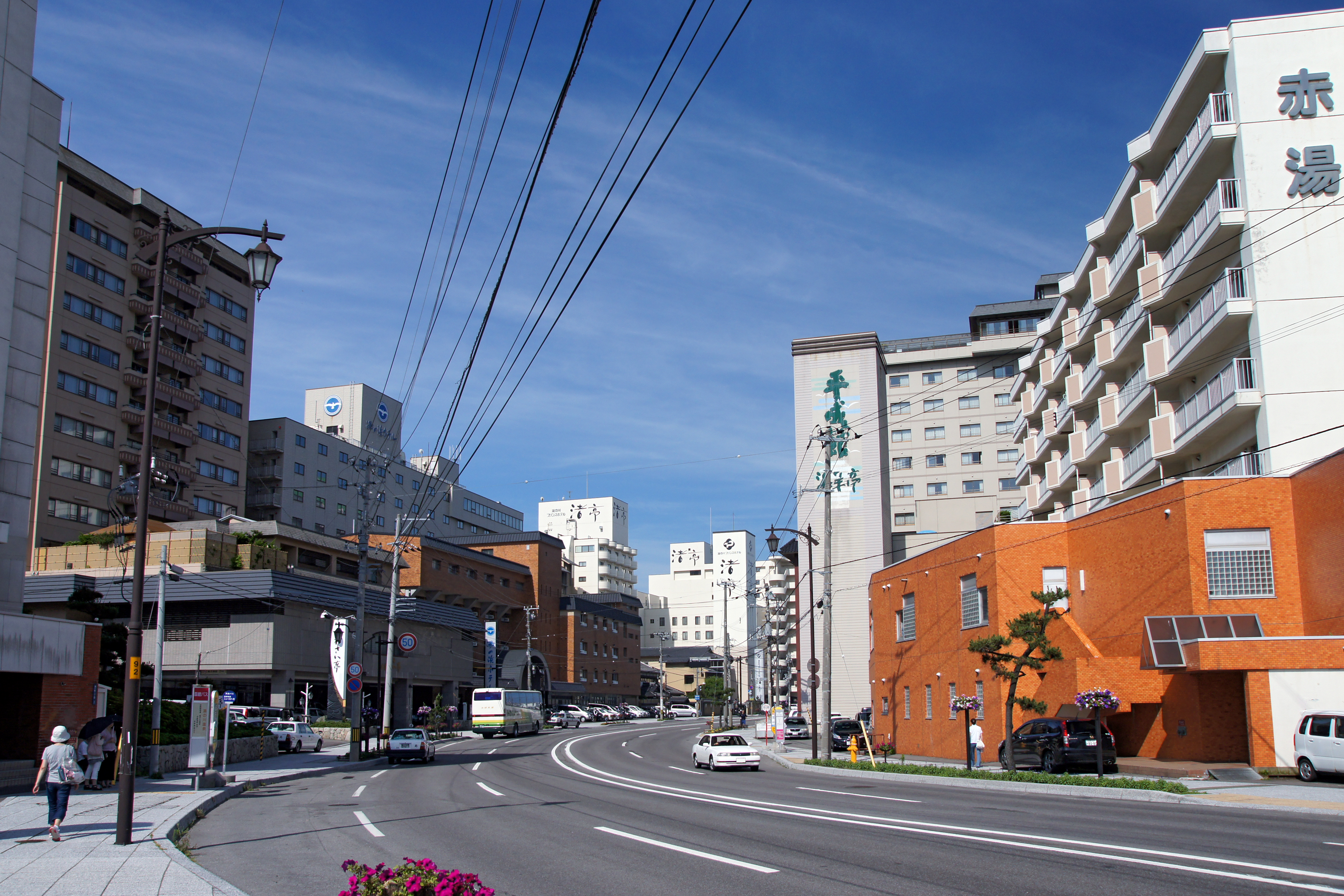
Yunokawa Onsen

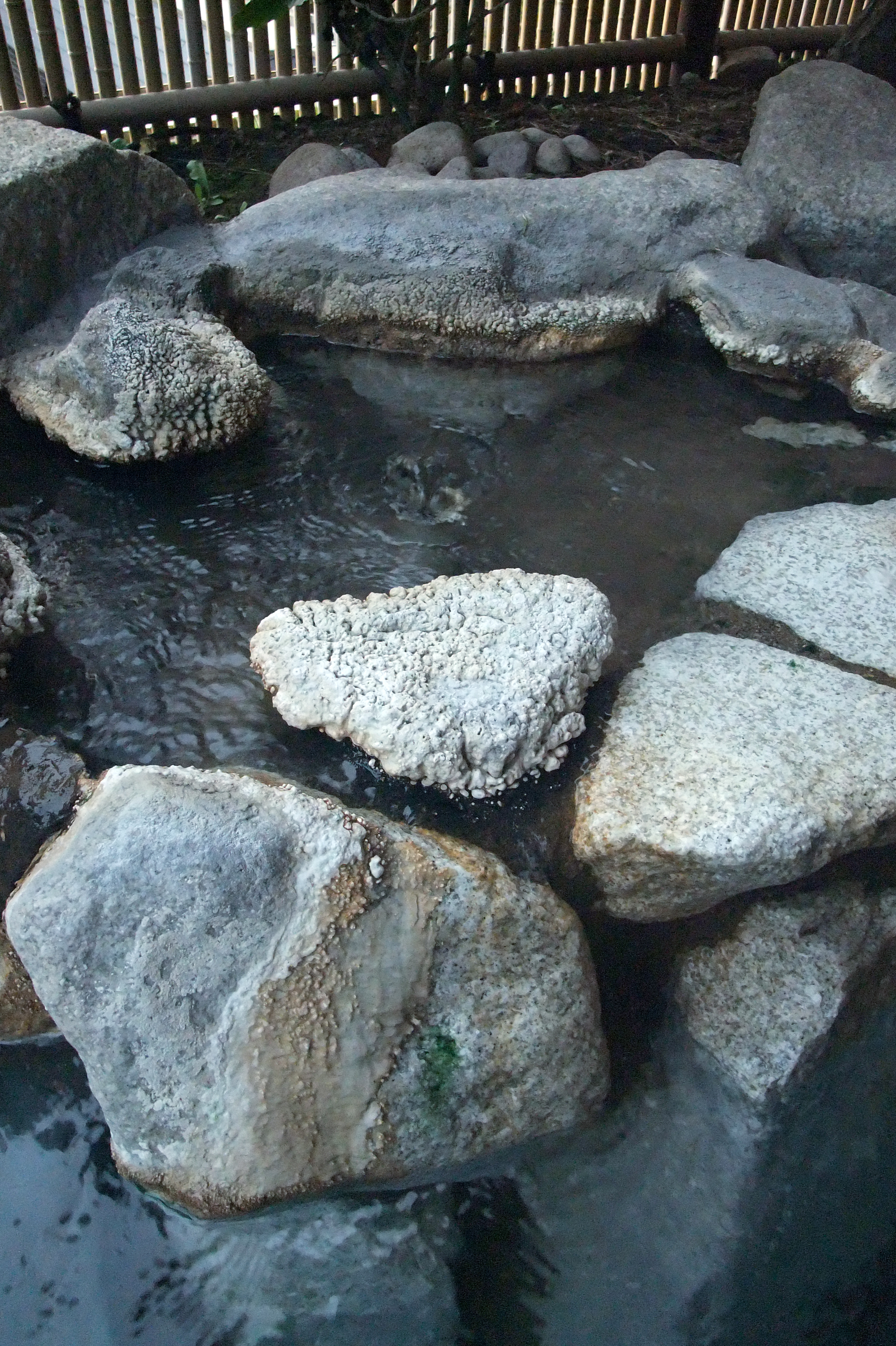
Heiseikan Shiosaitei Yunokawa Onsen hot spring

The Yunokawa Onsen (湯の川温泉) is a well known onsen in Japan on the northern island of Hokkaidō. It is located on the outskirts of Hakodate city close to Hakodate Airport.

== History ==
The meaning of "Yunokawa" in Japanese is "hot spring river".

This onsen is considered by Japanese to be one of the three major hot springs in Hokkaidō. Its origins are said to date back to 1653 when a lord of the Matsumae clan was healed of an incurable illness by bathing in its waters. Legend says that Seiryoin (清涼院), the 9th Lord of Matsumae Domain's mother, had him bathe for medical purposes in the Yunokawa Onsen in 1653. Having recovered from illness, and she had the Yakushido (薬師堂) rebuilt to honor his recovery and it was dedicated to Waniguchi (鰐口).

== Water profile ==
The hot spring water contains various minerals including sodium, calcium, and sulphur, and it is generally agreed to be beneficial for skin and circulation issues.

== Features ==
In the nearby Hakodate city area there is a tropical botanical garden where a population of Japanese snow monkeys live. In colder months, the monkeys frequently use the hot springs on the garden grounds.

== Gallery ==
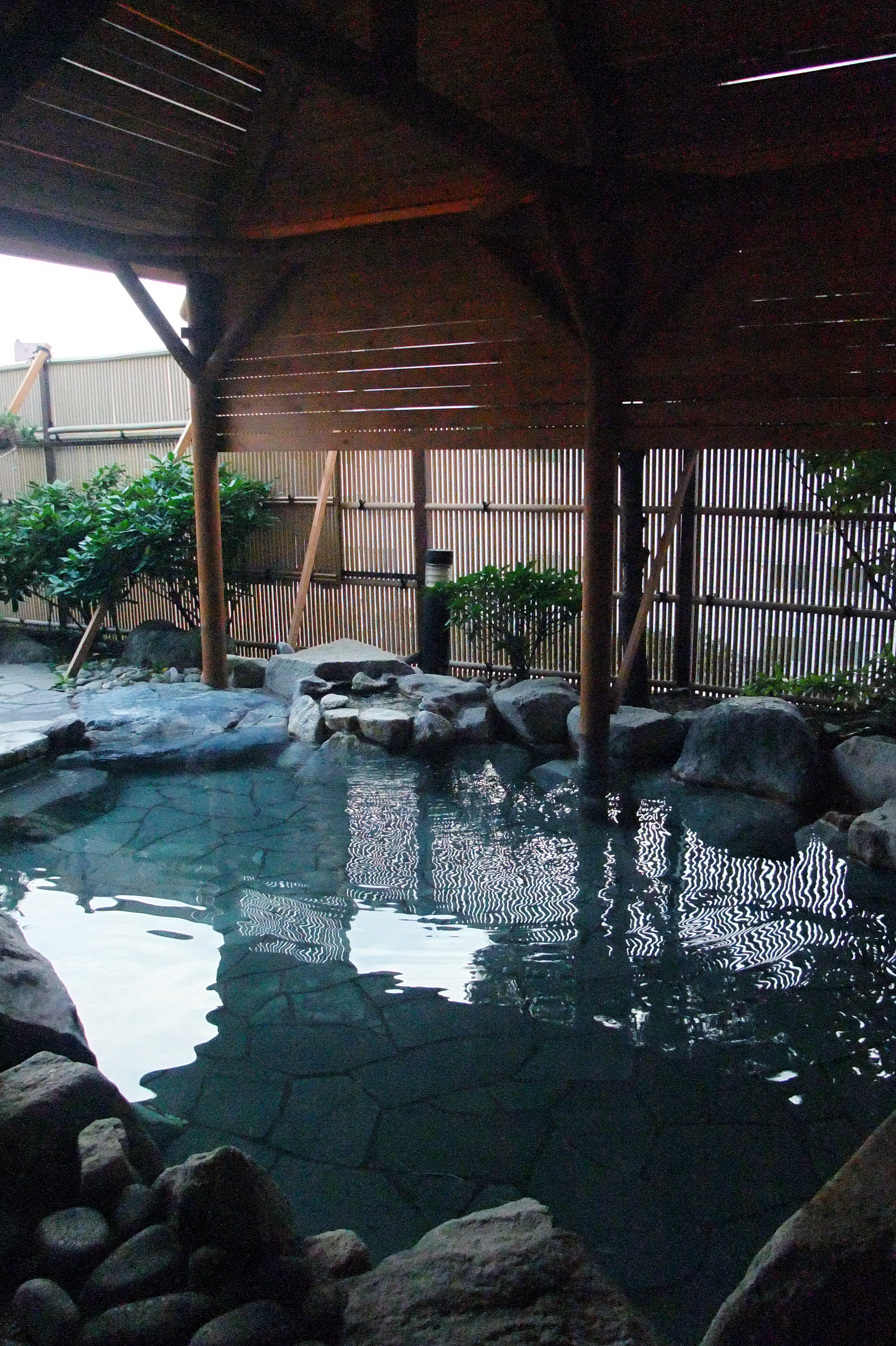
Heiseikan Shiosaitei Yunokawa Onsen

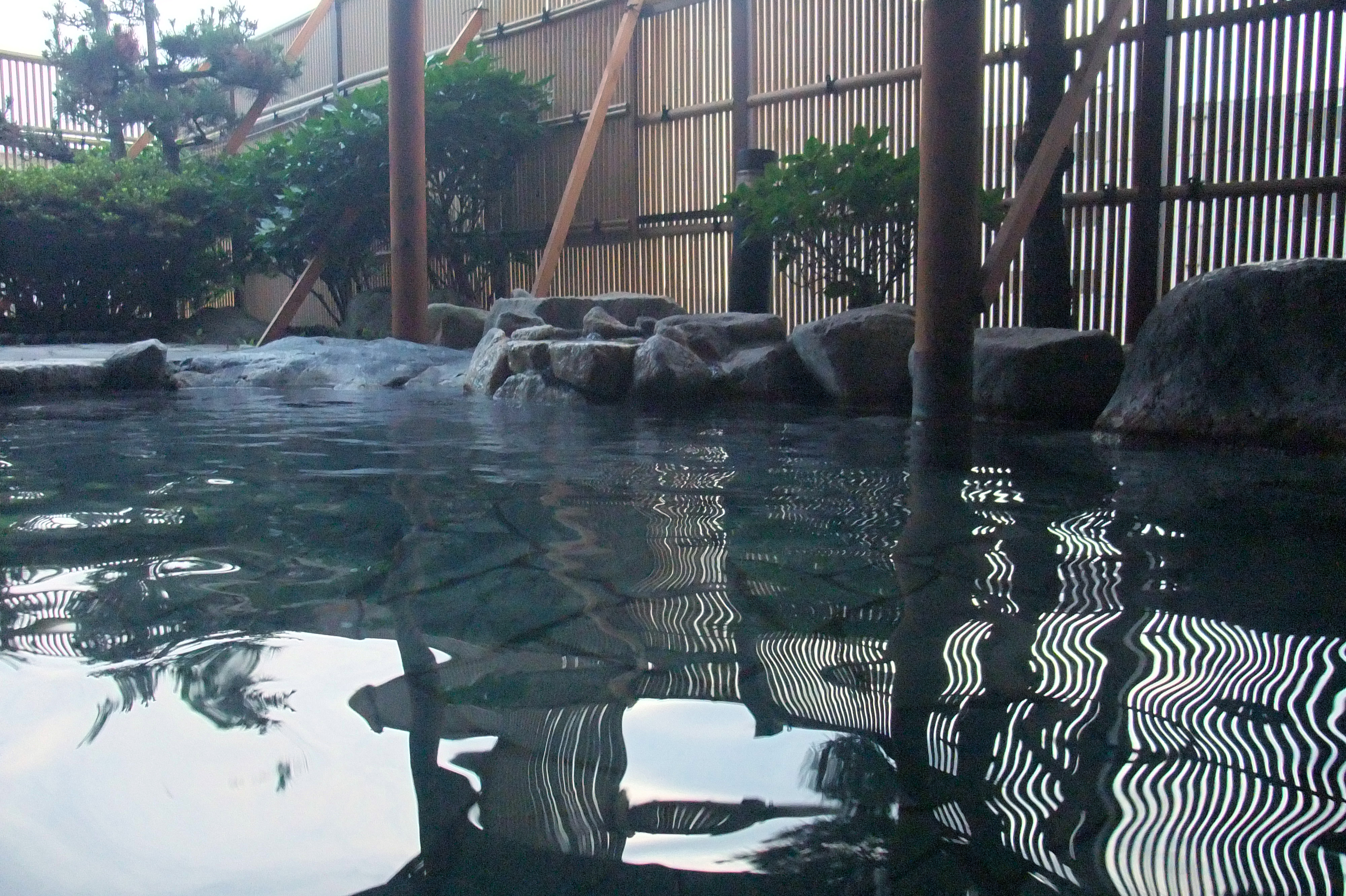
Heiseikan Shiosaitei Yunokawa Onsen

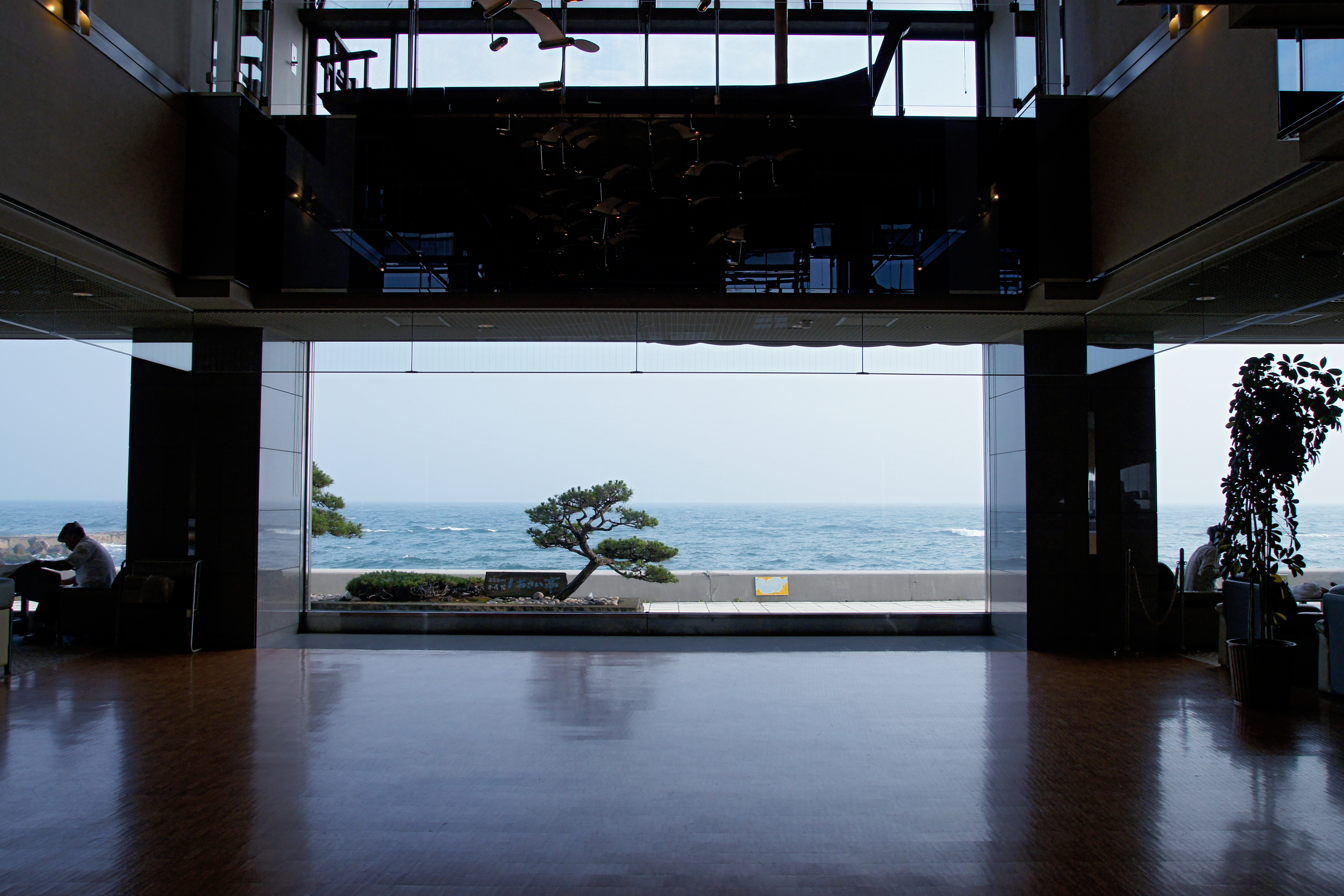
Heiseikan Shiosaitei Yunokawa Onsen

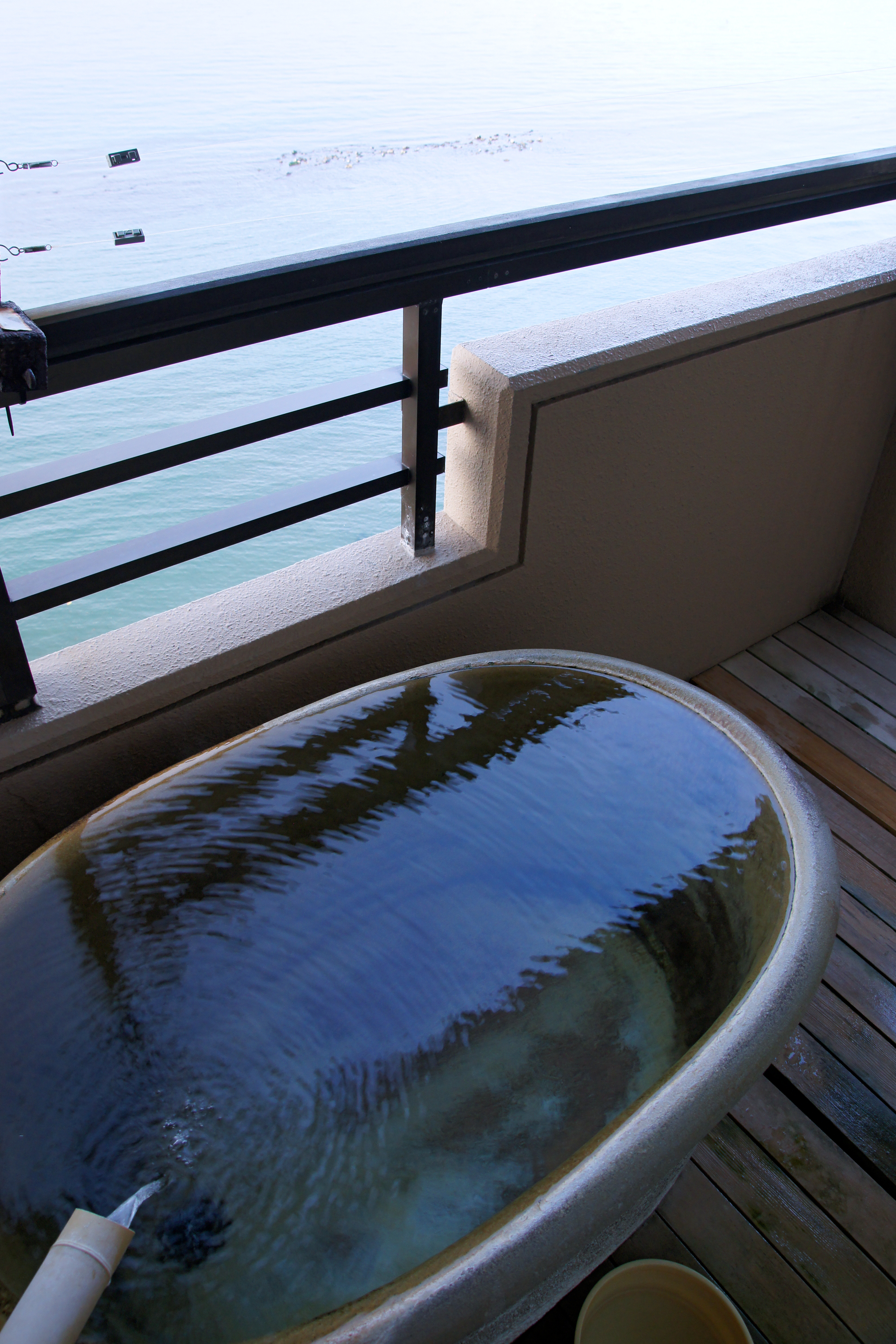
Heiseikan Shiosaitei Yunokawa Onsen

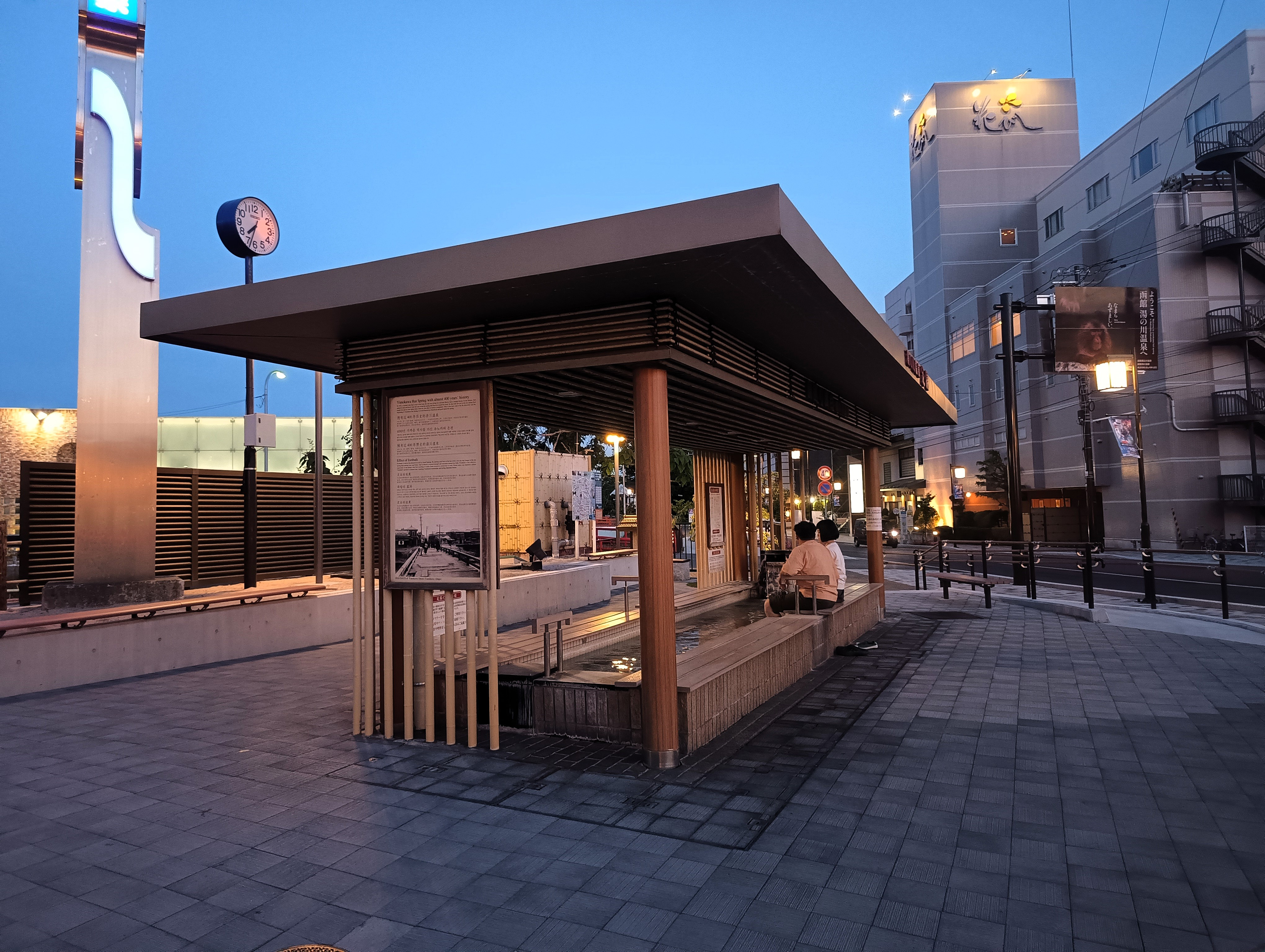
Footbath near Yunokawa-onsen tram stop
