= Shiribeshi Expressway =

Incomplete two-lane national expressway in Hokkaido, Japan

Shiribeshi Expressway
- 後志自動車道

Route information
- Length: 23.3 km (14.5 mi)
- Existed: 2018–present

Major junctions
- East end: Sasson Expressway at Otaru Junction
- West end: Hokkaido Route 753 at Yoichi Interchange

Location
- Country: Japan
- Major cities: Otaru; Yoichi

Highway system
- National highways of Japan; Expressways of Japan

The Shiribeshi Expressway (後志自動車道, Shiribeshi Jidōshadō) is an incomplete two-lane national expressway in Shiribeshi Subprefecture of Hokkaido, Japan. It is owned and operated by East Nippon Expressway Company and is signed E5A as an extension of the Hokkaido Expressway under the "2016 Proposal for Realization of Expressway Numbering."

== Route description ==
Officially, the expressway is referred to as the Trans-Hokkaido Expressway Otaru-Kutchan Route.

The Shiribeshi Expressway was made to provide a high-speed alternate route to Japan National Route 5 in Shiribeshi Subprefecture. After the events of the 2011 Tōhoku earthquake and tsunami, it was deemed necessary to provide an inland route during a tsunami event. Frequent volcanic activity from Mount Usu to the south also increased the demand of such a high-speed route.

The expressway's eastern terminus is at an interchange with the Sasson Expressway, just to the east of the central part of Otaru. Sasson Expressway eastbound traffic from Otaru cannot travel west onto the Shiribeshi Expressway. From here the expressway quickly travels southwest and away from the coast. It travels through many tunnels curving first to the west, then the northwest, and finally back to the west near Shioya Station on the Hakodate Main Line. After this curve the route comes to a junction with Hokkaido Route 1173. Continuing west through more tunnel, the expressway crosses into the town of Yoichi where it comes to its temporary western terminus at Hokkaido Route 753.

== History ==
The first section of the expressway, from the Sasson Expressway to Yoichi Interchange, was opened to drivers on 8 December 2018 by NEXCO East Japan.

== Future ==
The expressway is planned to be extended from its current western terminus (as of January 2019) in Yoichi southwest to National Route 5 in Kutchan. The proposed length of the completed expressway is 62.4 kilometres (38.8 mi).

== Junction list ==
The entire expressway is in Hokkaido. Aside from the eastern terminus at Otaru, exit numbers are carried over from the final number of the Sasson Expressway (11).

| Location | km | mi | Exit | Name | Destinations | Notes |
|---|---|---|---|---|---|---|
| Otaru | 0 | 0.0 | 9 | Otaru | Sasson Expressway – Sapporo, Central Otaru, Shin-Nihonkai Ferry (to Maizuru) | Eastern terminus. Eastbound traffic on the Sasson Expressway cannot access the Shiribeshi Expressway |
| Otaru | 14.3 | 8.9 | 12 | Otaru-Shioya | Hokkaido Route 1173 | |
| Yoichi | 23.3 | 14.5 | 13 | Yoichi | Hokkaido Route 753 | Current western terminus as of January 2019 |
1.000 mi = 1.609 km; 1.000 km = 0.621 mi: Incomplete access
