= Kotoni Station (JR Hokkaido) =

Railway station in Sapporo, Japan

Coordinates: 43°04′53″N 141°18′27″E

Kotoni Station 琴似駅
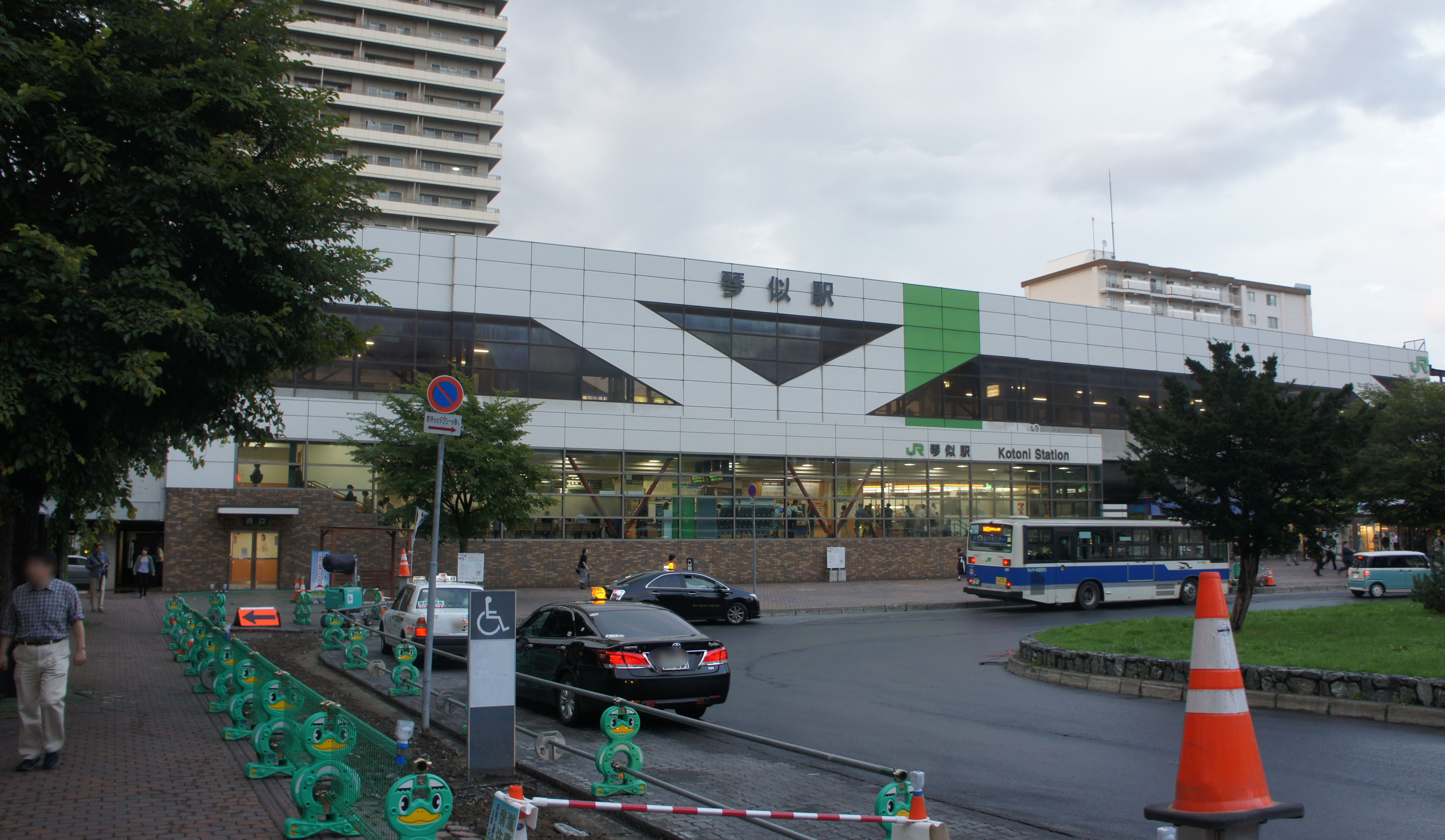
- Station building, August 2018

General information
- Location: Nishi-ku, Sapporo, Hokkaido; Japan
- Operator: JR Hokkaido
- Line: ■ Hakodate Main Line
- Distance: 282.5 km from Hakodate
- Platforms: 1 island platform
- Tracks: 2

Other information
- Status: Staffed
- Station code: S03

History
- Opened: 1880

Passengers
- FY2015: 11,518 daily
Location

Kotoni Station (琴似駅, Kotoni-eki) is a railway station on the Hakodate Main Line in Nishi-ku, Sapporo, Hokkaido, Japan, operated by the Hokkaido Railway Company (JR Hokkaido). It is numbered S03.

== Lines ==
Kotoni Station is served by the Hakodate Main Line.

== Station layout ==
The station consists of an elevated island platform serving two tracks. The station has automated ticket machines, automated turnstiles which accept Kitaca, and a "Midori no Madoguchi" staffed ticket office.

=== Platforms ===
1	■ Hakodate Main Line	for Teine, Otaru, and Kutchan
2	■ Hakodate Main Line	for Sapporo, Iwamizawa, and New Chitose Airport

== Adjacent stations ==
«	Service	»
Hakodate Main Line
Teine (S07)	Semi-Rapid	Sapporo (01)
Teine (S07)	Rapid	Sapporo (01)
Hassamu-Chūō (S04)	Local	Sōen (S02)

== Surrounding area ==
- Subway Kotoni Station (Tōzai Line)
- Kotoni Station Post Office
- Kotoni Nishi Police Station
- Tsuruha drug Kotoni-eki Higashi-guchi store
- Sapporo Agricultural Cooperative Association (JA Sapporo), Kotoni branch
- Hokkaido Bank, Hachi-ken branch
- Sapporo Shinkin Bank, Kotoni branch
- Sorachi Shinkin Bank, Kotoni branch
- Asahikawa Shinkin Bank, Kotoni branch
- North Pacific Bank, Kotoni branch
