= Sasson Expressway =

Expressway in Hokkaido, Japan

Sasson Expressway
- 札樽自動車道

Route information
- Length: 38.3 km (23.8 mi)
- Existed: 1971–present

Major junctions
- From: Sapporo Junction in Sapporo; Dō-Ō Expressway
- To: Otaru Interchange in Otaru, Hokkaidō; National Route 5 Hokkaido Prefectural Route 17

Location
- Country: Japan

Highway system
- National highways of Japan; Expressways of Japan

The Sasson Expressway (札樽自動車道, Sasson Jidōshadō) is a 4-laned national expressway in Hokkaidō, Japan. It is operated by the East Nippon Expressway Company.

== Naming ==
The name Sasson is a kanji acronym of two characters. The first character represents Sapporo (札幌) and the second represents Otaru (小樽), which are the two cities connected by the expressway.

Officially the expressway is a part of the Hokkaidō Ōdan Expressway Nemuro Route and Abashiri Route.

== Overview ==
The first section of the expressway opened in 1971 with two lanes ahead of the 1972 Winter Olympics. Expansion to four lanes was completed in 1974. The entire route was completed in 1992 with a connection to the Dō-Ō Expressway.

The speed limit is 80 km/h along the entire route.

The section from Sapporo-nishi Interchange through Sapporo Junction to Sapporo-minami Interchange on the Dō-Ō Expressway is built to an urban expressway standard and tolls are charged at a flat rate. As of March 2008 the toll on this section is 400 yen for regular passenger cars. Tolls on all other sections of the expressway are assessed according to distance travelled in the same manner as most other national expressways.

== List of interchanges and features ==
- IC - interchange, JCT - junction, PA - parking area, BS - bus stop, TN - tunnel, BR - bridge, TB - toll gate

No.	Name	Connections	Dist. from Origin	Dist. from Terminus	Bus Stop	Notes	Location (all in Hokkaidō)
Through to Dō-Ō Expressway
(32)	Sapporo JCT	Dō-Ō Expressway	0.0	38.3			Shiroishi-ku, Sapporo
BR	Toyohiragawa Bridge		↓	↑		Toyohira River crossing	Shiroishi-ku, Sapporo
BR	Toyohiragawa Bridge		↓	↑		Toyohira River crossing	Higashi-ku, Sapporo
1	Kariki IC	National Route 274 (Sapporo Shindō); National Route 275	1.9	36.4		Sapporo-bound exit, Otaru-bound entrance only	Higashi-ku, Sapporo
2	Fushiko IC	National Route 274 (Sapporo Shindō); Pref. Route 112 (Sapporo Tōbetsu Route)	3.4	34.9		Otaru-bound exit, Sapporo-bound entrance only	Higashi-ku, Sapporo
BR	Fugome Bridge		↓	↑			Higashi-ku, Sapporo
3	Sapporo-kita IC	National Route 274 (Sapporo Shindō)	7.6	30.7		Otaru-bound exit, Sapporo-bound entrance only	Higashi-ku, Sapporo
4	Sapporo-kita IC	National Route 5 (Sapporo Shindō)	7.6	30.7		Sapporo-bound exit, Otaru-bound entrance only	Kita-ku, Sapporo
5	Shinkawa IC	National Route 5 (Sapporo Shindō); Pref. Route 125 (Maeda Shinkawa Route)	10.2	28.1		Otaru-bound exit, Sapporo-bound entrance only	Kita-ku, Sapporo
6/TB	Sapporo-nishi IC/TB	National Route 5 (Sapporo Shindō); Pref. Route 124 (Miyanosawa Kitaichijō Route)	14.0	24.3		Sapporo-bound exit, Otaru-bound entrance only	Nishi-ku, Sapporo
6/TB	Sapporo-nishi IC/TB	National Route 5 (Sapporo Shindō); Pref. Route 124 (Miyanosawa Kitaichijō Route)	14.0	24.3		Sapporo-bound exit, Otaru-bound entrance only	Teine-ku, Sapporo
7	Teine IC		17.5	20.8		Otaru-bound entrance and exit, Sapporo-bound entrance only	Teine-ku, Sapporo
PA	Kanayama PA/ Emergency Exit		20.0	18.3		Emergency Exit: Authorized vehicles only	Teine-ku, Sapporo
BR	Hoshiokigawa Bridge		↓	↑			Teine-ku, Sapporo
BR	Hoshiokigawa Bridge		↓	↑			Otaru
8	Zenibako IC	Pref. Route 147 (Zenibako Inter Route)	23.6	14.7		Zenibako River crossing	Otaru
BS	Miharashi Bus Stop		24.8	13.5	○		Otaru
TN	Hariusu Tunnel		↓	↑			Otaru
9	Otaru JCT	Shiribeshi Expressway	34.0	4.3		No access: Asari IC → Otaru-shioya IC	Otaru
BS	Shinkō Bus Stop		34.7	3.6	○		Otaru
10	Asari IC	Pref. Route 1 (Otaru Jōzankei Route)	35.3	3.0			Otaru
TB	Asari Toll Gate		↓	↑			Otaru
TN	Asari Tunnel		↓	↑			Otaru
TN	Wakatake Tunnel		↓	↑			Otaru
11	Otaru IC	National Route 5 Pref. Route 17 (Otarukō Route)	38.3	0.0			Otaru
