= Teine Station =

Railway station in Sapporo, Japan

Coordinates: 43°7′14″N 141°14′35″E

S07 Teine Station 手稲駅
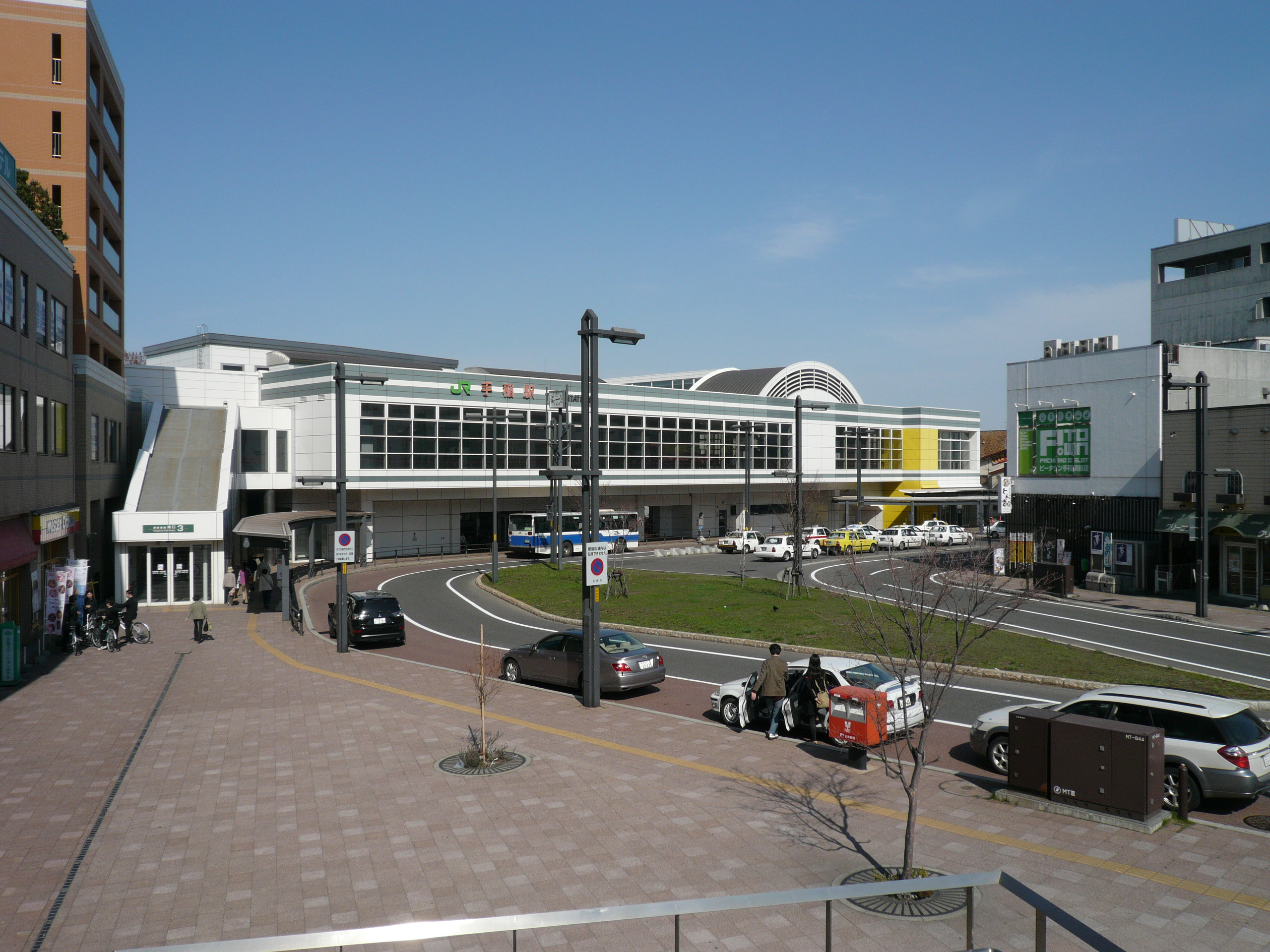
- South side of Teine Station, May 2010

General information
- Location: Teine-ku, Sapporo, Hokkaido; Japan
- Operator: JR Hokkaido
- Line: ■ Hakodate Main Line
- Distance: 275.7 km from Hakodate
- Platforms: 2 island platforms
- Tracks: 4

Other information
- Status: Staffed
- Station code: S07

History
- Opened: 1880

Passengers
- FY2015: 15,335 daily
Location

Teine Station (手稲駅, Teine-eki) is a railway station in Teine-ku, Sapporo, Hokkaido, Japan, operated by Hokkaido Railway Company (JR Hokkaido). The station is numbered S07.

== Lines ==
Teine Station is served by the Hakodate Main Line.

== Station layout ==
The station consists of two island platforms serving four tracks, with the station situated above the tracks. The station has automated ticket machines, automated turnstiles which accept Kitaca, and a "Midori no Madoguchi" staffed ticket office.

== Platforms ==
1	■ Hakodate Main Line	for Otaru and Kutchan
2	■ Hakodate Main Line	for Otaru for Sapporo, Iwamizawa, and New Chitose Airport
3	■ Hakodate Main Line	for Sapporo, Iwamizawa, and New Chitose Airport
4	■ Hakodate Main Line	for Sapporo, Iwamizawa, and New Chitose Airport (morning peak Home Liner only)

== Adjacent stations ==
«	Service	»
Hakodate Main Line
Inaho (S08)	Semi-Rapid	Kotoni (S03)
Otaru-Chikkō (S13)	Rapid	Kotoni (S03)
Inaho (S08)	Local	Inazumi-Kōen (S06)

== Surrounding area ==
- National Route 5 (to Hakodate)
- Hokkaido Institute of Technology
