= Japan National Route 5 =

National highway in Japan

National Route 5
- 国道5号
- Japan National Route 5 highlighted in red

Route information
- Length: 288.5 km (179.3 mi)
- Existed: 4 December 1952–present

Major junctions
- South end: National Route 278 / National Route 279 in Hakodate
- North end: National Route 12 in Chūō-ku, Sapporo

Location
- Country: Japan
- Major cities: Oshamanbe; Niseko; Kutchan; Otaru

Highway system
- National highways of Japan; Expressways of Japan
← National Route 4	→ National Route 6

National Route 5 (国道5号, Kokudō Go-gō) is a major highway on the island and prefecture of Hokkaido in northern Japan. The 288.5-kilometer (179.3 mi) highway begins at an intersection with National Routes 279 and 278 in Hakodate. It travels north across the southern half of the island, traveling through Otaru where it curves to the east toward its endpoint at an intersection with National Route 12 in Chūō-ku, Sapporo.

== Route description ==
=== Overlapping sections ===
- In Oshamanbe, from Kunnui intersection to Asahihama intersection: Route 230
- From Kutchan (North-4 West-1 intersection) to Kyōwa (Kunitomi intersection): Route 276
- From Yoichi (Yoichi Station intersection) to Otaru (Inaho 2-18 intersection): Route 229

=== Municipalities passed through ===
- Oshima Subprefecture
  - Hakodate - Nanae - Mori - Yakumo - Oshamanbe
- Shiribeshi Subprefecture
  - Kuromatsunai - Rankoshi - Niseko - Kyōwa - Niki - Yoichi - Otaru
- Ishikari Subprefecture
  - Sapporo

== History ==
National Route 5 traces its origin to the Sapporo Hondō, a road designed by Horace Capron, in 1872. Capron was an American advisor to the Hokkaido Development Commission who was paid to assist in the development of Sapporo as a planned city. The Sapporo Hondō connected Sapporo to Hakodate at the southern end of the Hokkaido where sea connections to the main island of Japan, Honshu, were located. The Sapporo Hondō was completed in 1877.

On 4 December 1952, the Cabinet of Japan designated the Sapporo Hondō as First Class National Highway 5. On 1 April 1965, it was reclassified as National Route 5.

== Gallery ==
Japan National Route 5

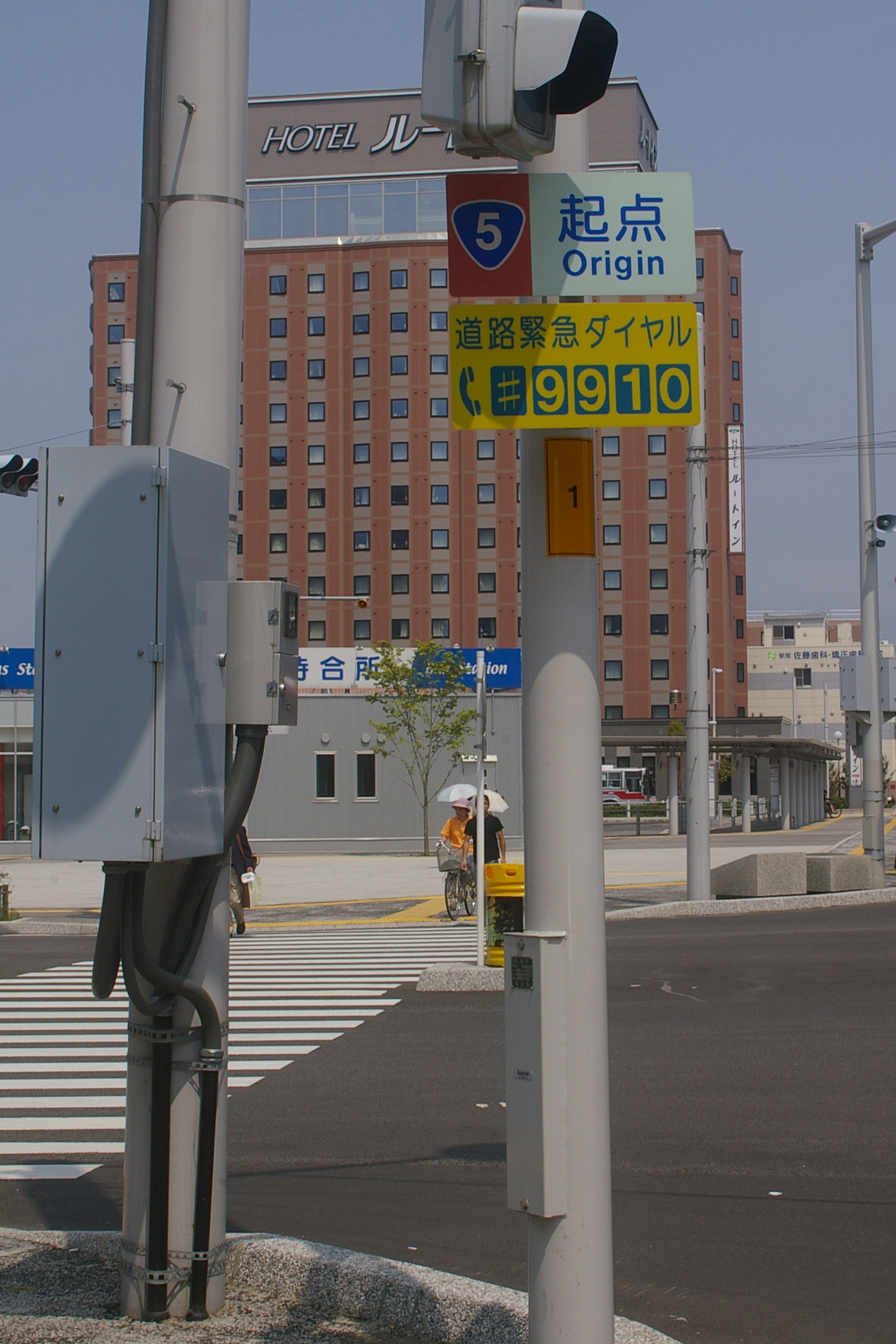
National Route 5's origin point and southern terminus in Hakodate

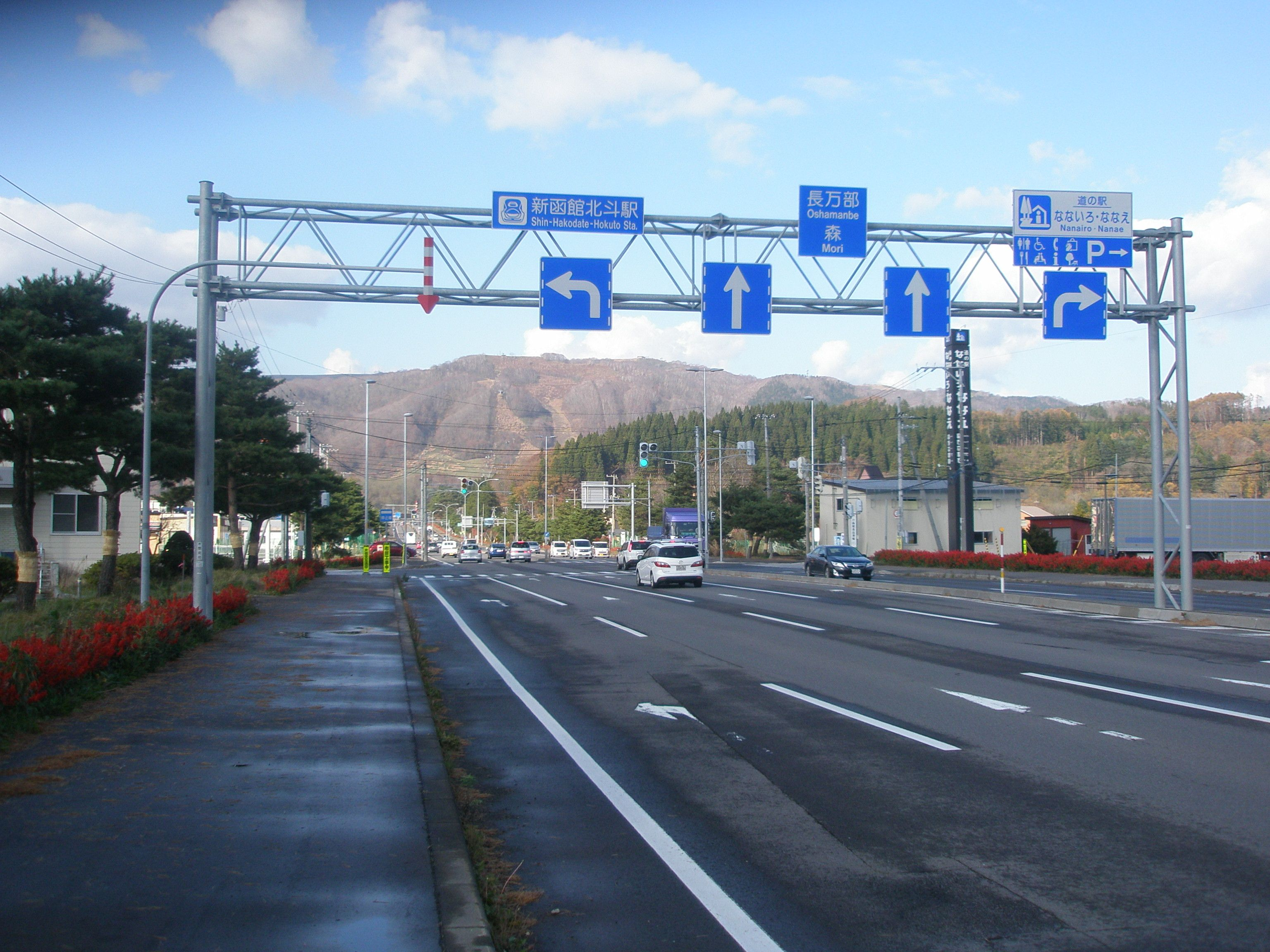
National Route 5 in Nanae near Shin-Hakodate-Hokuto Station

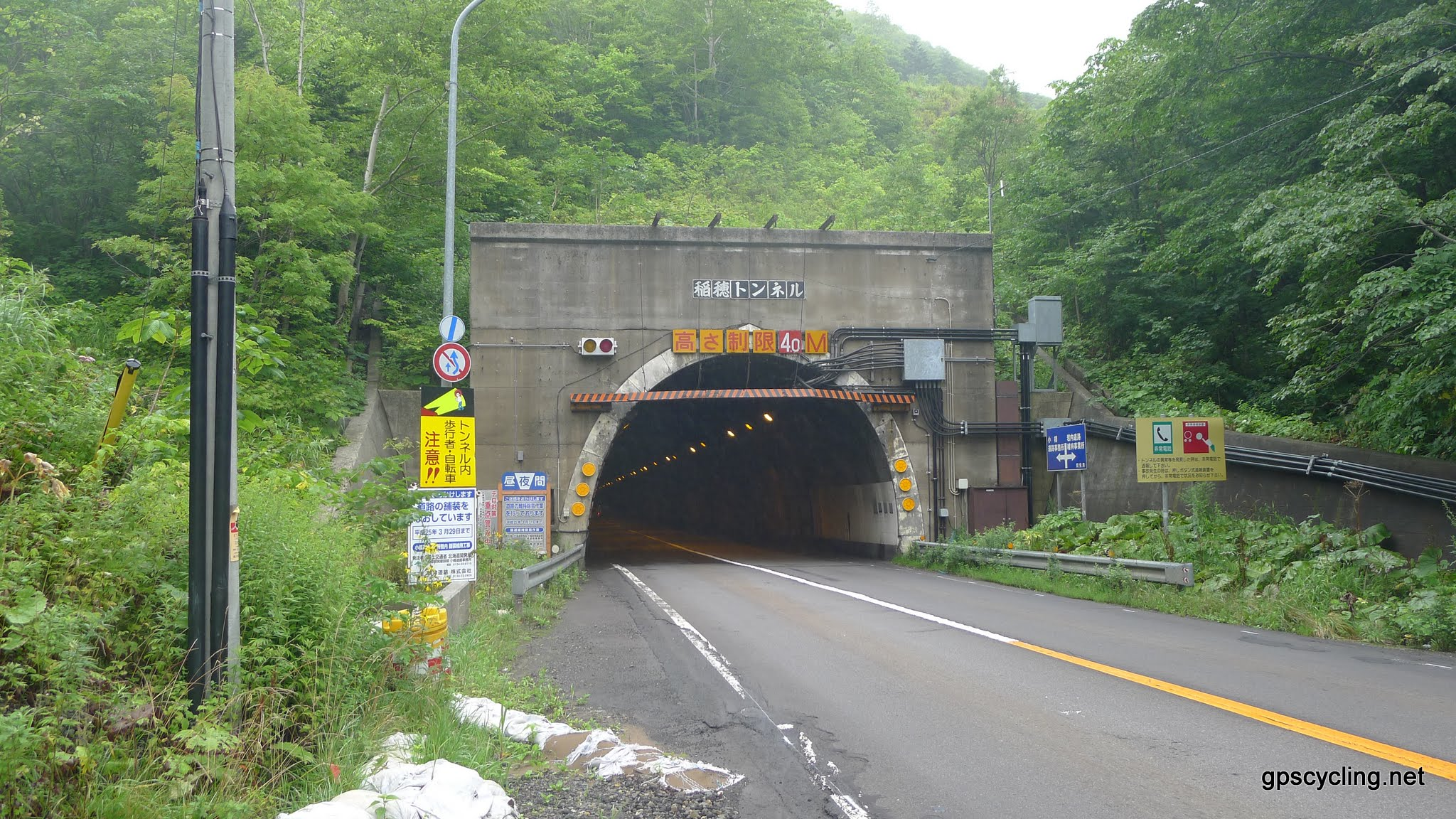
Inaho Tunnel carries National Route 5 under Inaho Pass

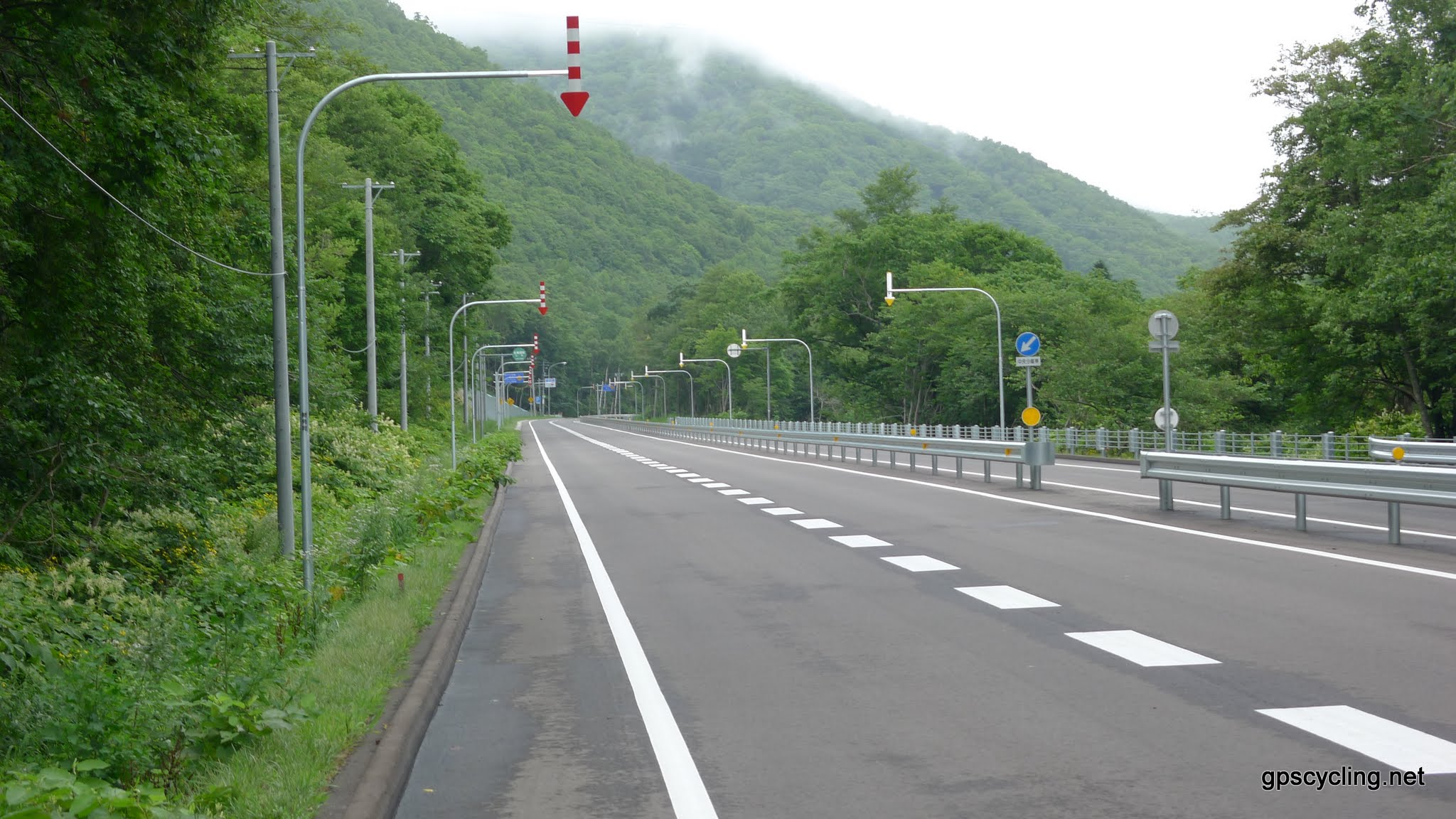
National Route 5 in Kyōwa

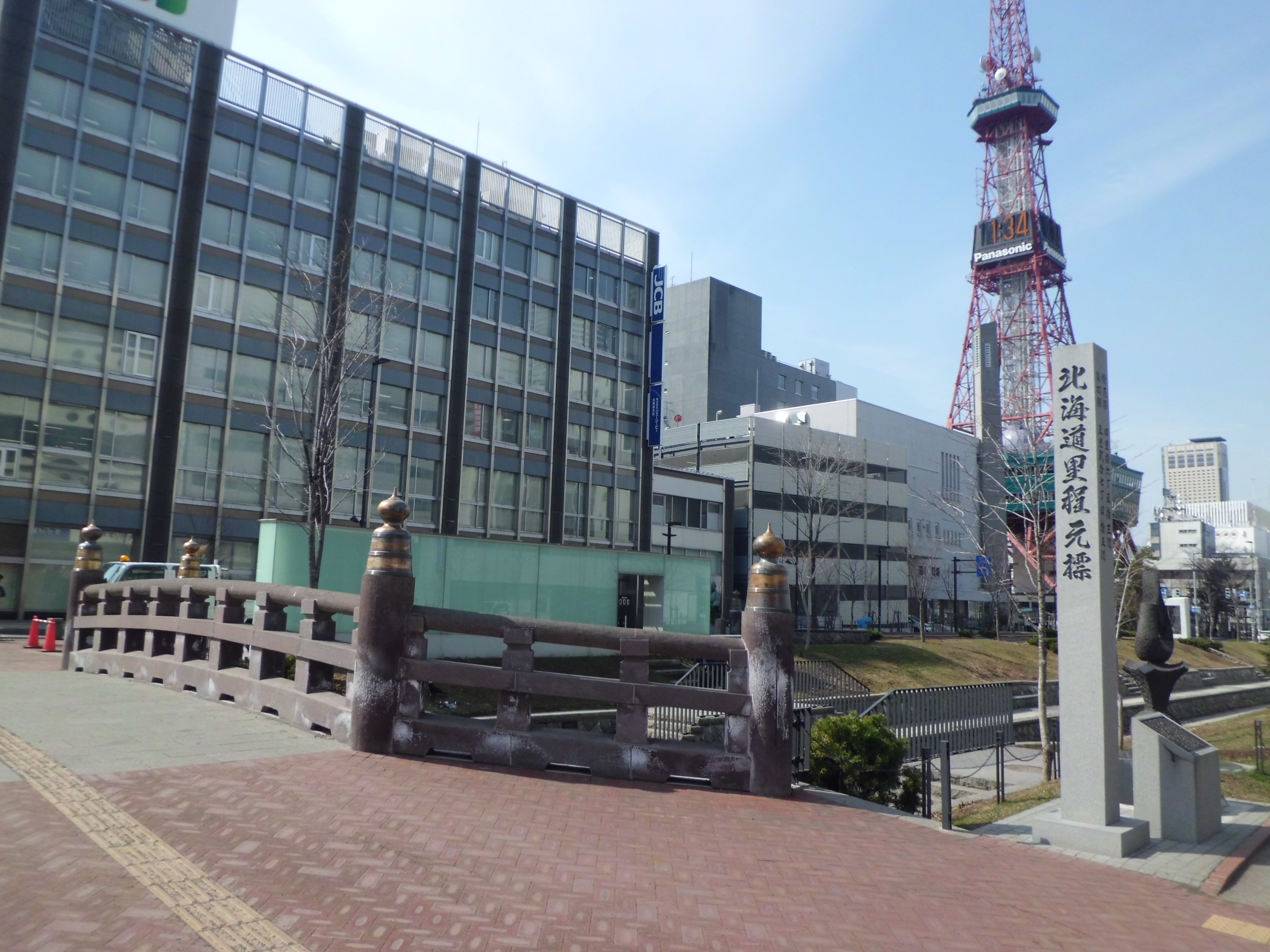
The origin point of Hokkaido's roads in Sapporo, the northern terminus of National Route 5 lies 350 meters to the north of the marker

== Major junctions ==
The route lies entirely within Hokkaido.

Location	km	mi	Destinations	Notes
Hakodate	0.0	0.0	National Route 278 north – Mount E, Yunokawa; National Route 279 south – Foreign Cemetery, Mount Hakodate	Southern terminus; highway continues south as National Route 279
Hakodate	1.9	1.2	National Route 227 west – Esashi, Matsumae; Hokkaido Route 571 east – Goryōkaku Park	
Hakodate	3.2	2.0	Hokkaido Route 347 – Goryōkaku Park	
Hakodate	5.4	3.4	National Route 5 (Hakodate Shindō) – Esashi, Matsumae, Sapporo, Oshamanbe	
Hakodate	6.1	3.8	Hokkaido Route 100 – Hokuto Ferry, Mount E, Yunokawa	
Nanae	11.1	6.9	Hokkaido Route 969 east – to Hakodate Shindō	Southern end of Hokkaido Route 969 concurrency
Nanae	11.4	7.1	Hokkaido Route 969 west – Hokuto	Northern end of Hokkaido Route 969 concurrency
Nanae	15.3	9.5	Hokkaido Route 264 east – to Hakodate Shindō; Hokkaido Route 676 west – Shin-Hakodate-Hokuto Station, Hokuto	
Nanae	19.3	12.0	Hakodate Shindō south – Hakodate	Nanae-Fujishiro Interchange (E5 exit 4)
Nanae	20.1	12.5	Hokkaido Route 1176 south – Shin-Hakodate-Hokuto Station	
Nanae	21.1	13.1	Hokkaido Route 96 south – Hokuto	
Nanae	28.7	17.8	Hokkaido Route 43 north – Shikabe, Ōnuma Quasi-National Park	
Mori	30.9	19.2	Hokkaido Route 43 south Hokkaido Route 149 west – to Dō-Ō Expressway, Green Pier Onuma Ski Area	
Mori	42.4	26.3	National Route 278 south – Mount E, Shikabe; Hokkaido Route 1156 south – to Dō-Ō Expressway	
Mori	43.1	26.8	Hokkaido Route 794 north – Central Mori	
Mori	43.9	27.3	Hokkaido Route 606 – Central Mori, Torizakihakkei	
Mori	45.6	28.3	Hokkaido Route 1028 east – Central Mori	
Yakumo	62.8	39.0	Dō-Ō Expressway – Hakodate, Muroran	Otoshibe Interchange (E5 exit 8); the short road leading to/from the interchange and Route 5 is designated as Hokkaido Route 1155
Yakumo	64.9	40.3	Hokkaido Route 573 south	
Yakumo	73.1	45.4	Hokkaido Route 42 west – Central Yakumo	
Yakumo	73.8	45.9	Hokkaido Route 572 east – Yakumo Port	
Yakumo	75.9	47.2	National Route 277 west – to Dō-Ō Expressway, Esashi	
Yakumo	77.1	47.9	Hokkaido Route 1029 south – Central Yakumo	
Oshamambe	95.9	59.6	National Route 230 west – to Dō-Ō Expressway, Setana, Pirika Dam	Southern end of National Route 230 concurrency
Oshamambe	104.6	65.0	Hokkaido Route 1141 west	
Oshamambe	105.9	65.8	National Route 37 east / National Route 230 east – Muroran, Tōyako	Northern end of National Route 230 concurrency
Oshamambe	107.6	66.9	Dō-Ō Expressway – Hakodate, Muroran	Oshamambe Interchange (E5 exit 11)
Oshamambe	115.6	71.8	Hokkaido Route 842 west – Futamata Spa	
Oshamambe	120.8	75.1	Hokkaido Route 9 north – Suttsu, Central Kuromatsunai	
Kuromatsunai	126.4	78.5	Hokkaido Route 266 (Milk Country Road) west – Central Kuromatsunai	Southern end of Hokkaido Route 266 concurrency
Kuromatsunai	127.0	78.9	Hokkaido Route 266 east – Toyoura	Northern end of Hokkaido Route 266 concurrency
Kuromatsunai	130.6	81.2	Hokkaido Route 265 west – Suttsu, Central Kuromatsunai	
Kuromatsunai	132.1	82.1	Hokkaido Route 344 east – Higashikawa	
Kuromatsunai	132.3	82.2	Kuromatsunai Shindō east – to Dō-Ō Expressway	Kuromatsunai Interchange (E5A exit 2)
Rankoshi	141.6	88.0	Hokkaido Route 752 north	
Rankoshi	146.7	91.2	Hokkaido Route 934 north	
Rankoshi	150.0	93.2	Hokkaido Route 267 north – Suttsu	
Rankoshi	152.9	95.0	Hokkaido Route 525 north – Rankoshi Station	
Rankoshi	153.8	95.6	Hokkaido Route 229 – Iwanai, Suttsu, Rankoshi Station	
Rankoshi	160.5	99.7	Hokkaido Route 207 north – Chisenupuri, Niseko Konbu Onsen	
Niseko	160.8	99.9	Hokkaido Route 32 south – Toyoura	
Niseko	167.1	103.8	Hokkaido Route 791 south	
Niseko	171.0	106.3	Hokkaido Route 66 – Rusutsu, Makkari, Iwanai, Niseko Resort Area	
Niseko	172.4	107.1	Hokkaido Route 792 west – Niseko Station	
Kutchan	179.5	111.5	Hokkaido Route 631 west – Niseko Resort Area	
Kutchan	181.9	113.0	Hokkaido Route 478 east – Kyōgoku	
Kutchan	182.6	113.5	Hokkaido Route 343 west – Niseko Resort Area	
Kutchan	183.6	114.1	Hokkaido Route 58 west – Niseko Resort Area	
Kutchan	184.2	114.5	National Route 276 east – Kimobetsu, Kyōgoku	Southern end of National Route 276 concurrency
Kyōwa	193.1	120.0	Hokkaido Route 604 west – Iwanai	
Kyōwa	197.8	122.9	National Route 276 west – Suttsu, Iwanai, Central Kyōwa	Northern end of National Route 276 concurrency
Niki	210.2	130.6	Hokkaido Route 1022 east – Akaigawa, Ginzan Station	
Niki	220.6	137.1	Hokkaido Route 455 east – Niki Station	
Yoichi	223.5	138.9	Hokkaido Route 36 south – to Shiribeshi Expressway, Akaigawa	
Yoichi	224.6	139.6	Hokkaido Route 755 south	
Yoichi	224.7	139.6	Hokkaido Route 753 south – to Shiribeshi Expressway	
Yoichi	225.0	139.8	National Route 229 south – Shakotan, Furubira; Hokkaido Route 228 east – Yoichi Station	Southern end of National Route 229 and Hokkaido Route 228 concurrency
Yoichi	225.7	140.2	Hokkaido Route 228 west – Shakotan, Furubira	Northern end of Hokkaido Route 228 concurrency
Yoichi	229.8	142.8	Hokkaido Route 1092 south	
Otaru	236.1	146.7	Hokkaido Route 956 (Otaru Loop Route) east – Shioya Station	
Otaru	243.8	151.5	Hokkaido Route 820 east – to Sasson Expressway, Ferry Terminal, Otaru Canal	
Otaru	244.4	151.9	Hokkaido Route 454 (Chūō-dōri) east – Otaru Port, Otaru Canal	
Otaru	244.7	152.0	National Route 229 ends Hokkaido Route 697 south – Asahi View Point, Mount Tengu	Northern end of National Route 229 concurrency, southern end of Hokkaido Route 697 concurrency
Otaru	246.4	153.1	National Route 393 south – Akaigawa; Hokkaido Route 697 north – Ferry Terminal, Parute Port	Northern end of Hokkaido Route 697 concurrency
Otaru	247.5	153.8	Sasson Expressway east Hokkaido Route 17 (Rinkosen) north – Otaru Port, Parute Port	Otaru Interchange (E5A exit 11)
Otaru	251.0	156.0	Hokkaido Route 1 south – Jozankei, Asarigawa Spa, Sasson Expressway	
Otaru	260.7	162.0	Hokkaido Route 225 east – Zenibako Station	
Otaru	262.4	163.0	Hokkaido Route 147 east – Sasson Expressway	
Otaru	262.7	163.2	Hokkaido Route 1226 north – Central Zenibako	
Otaru	263.7	163.9	National Route 337 east – Rumoi, Ishikari	Interchange
Sapporo	276.4	171.7	Hokkaido Route 128 (Oiwake-dōri) north – Shinkawa	
Sapporo	277.2	172.2	Sasson Expressway; Hokkaido Route 124 east – Sapporo Station, Chitose	Sapporo-nishi Interchange (E5A exit 6); southern end of National Route 5 serving as a frontage road to the Sasson Expressway
Sapporo	279.6	173.7	Hokkaido Route 452 (Shimoteine-dōri) – Maeda, Hachiken Station	
Sapporo	280.6	174.4	Hokkaido Route 125 (Shinkawa-dōri) – Ishikari Bay New Port, Maeda, Sapporo Station	
Sapporo	281.2	174.7	Sasson Expressway	Shinkawa Interchange (E5A exit 5)
Sapporo	283.4	176.1	Sasson Expressway	Sapporo-kita Interchange (E5A exit 4)
Sapporo	284.1	176.5	National Route 231 north (Sōseikawa-dōri); National Route 274 east (Sapporo Shindō)	Northern end of National Route 5 serving as a frontage road to the Sasson Expressway
Sapporo	285.3	177.3	Hokkaido Route 89 – Hachiken, Motomachi	
Sapporo	287.6	178.7	Hokkaido Route 273	
Sapporo	288.5	179.3	National Route 12 (Kita-ichi-jō Kariki-dōri) – Tōbetsu, Ebetsu, Teine, Otaru	Northern terminus, street continues as Sōseikawa-dōri
1.000 mi = 1.609 km; 1.000 km = 0.621 mi: Concurrency terminus
