= Sawara, Hokkaido =

Dissolved municipality in Hokkaidō, Japan

Sarawa 砂原町 さわらちょう
- Town
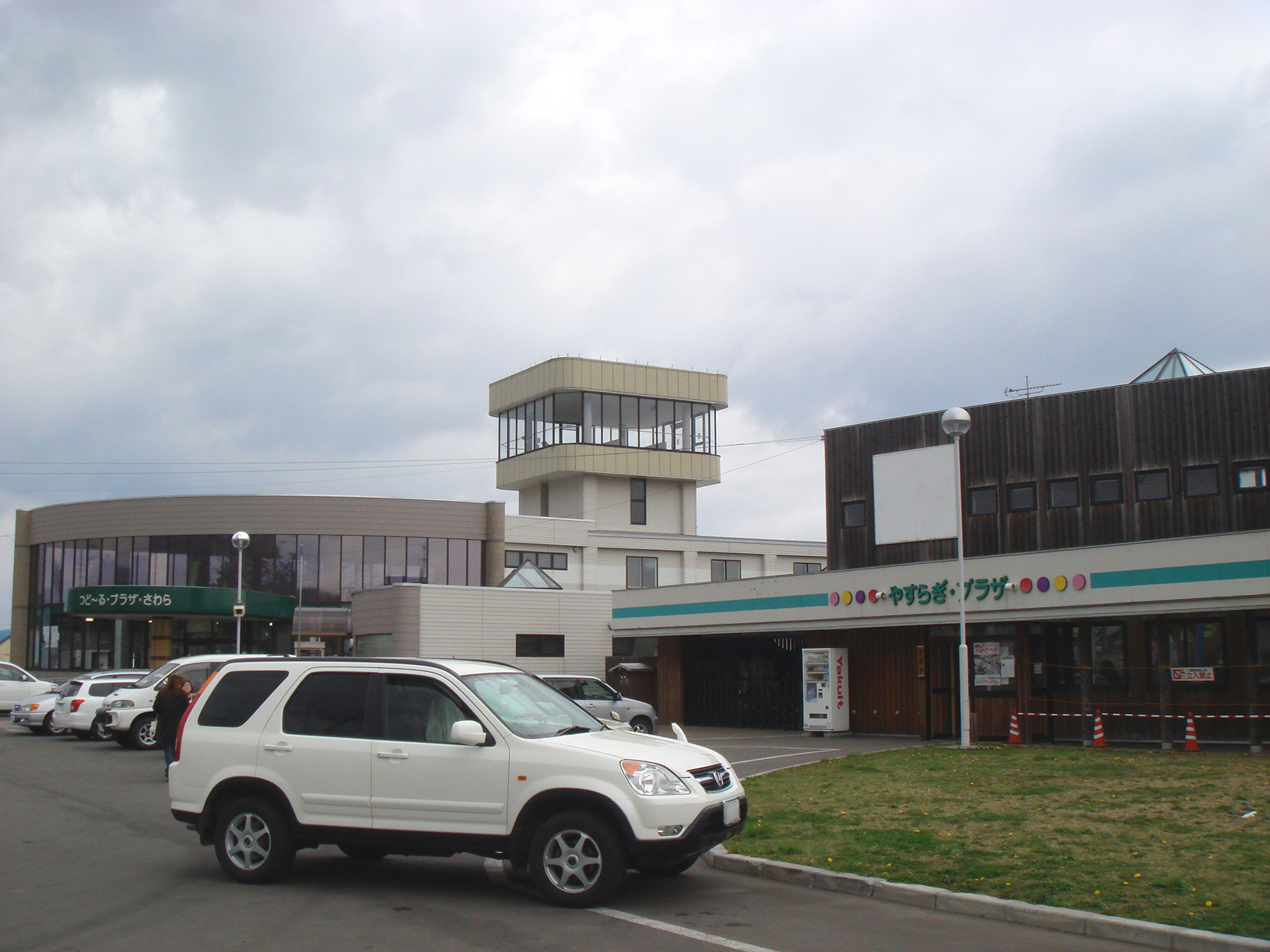
- Sarawa Tsudoru Plaza

- Flag Seal
- Interactive map of Sarawa
- Country: Japan
- Region: Hokkaido
- Prefecture: Hokkaido
- Subprefecture: Oshima
- District: Kayabe

Area
  - Total: 56.5 km^{2} (21.8 sq mi)

Population (2004)
  - Total: 4,857
  - Density: 86.0/km^{2} (223/sq mi)

Sawara (砂原町, Sawara-chō) was a town located in Kayabe District, Oshima Subprefecture, Hokkaido, Japan.

== Population ==
As of 2004, the town had an estimated population of 4,857 and a density of 85.44 persons per km^{2}. The total area was 56.85 km^{2}.

== History ==
On April 1, 2005, Sawara was merged into the expanded town of Mori and no longer exists as an independent municipality.
