= Oshima-Sawara Station =

Railway station in Mori, Hokkaido, Japan

Coordinates: 42.1218°N 140.6897°E

Oshima-Sawara Station (渡島砂原駅, Oshima-Sawara-eki) is a railway station in Mori, Kayabe District, Hokkaidō, Japan.

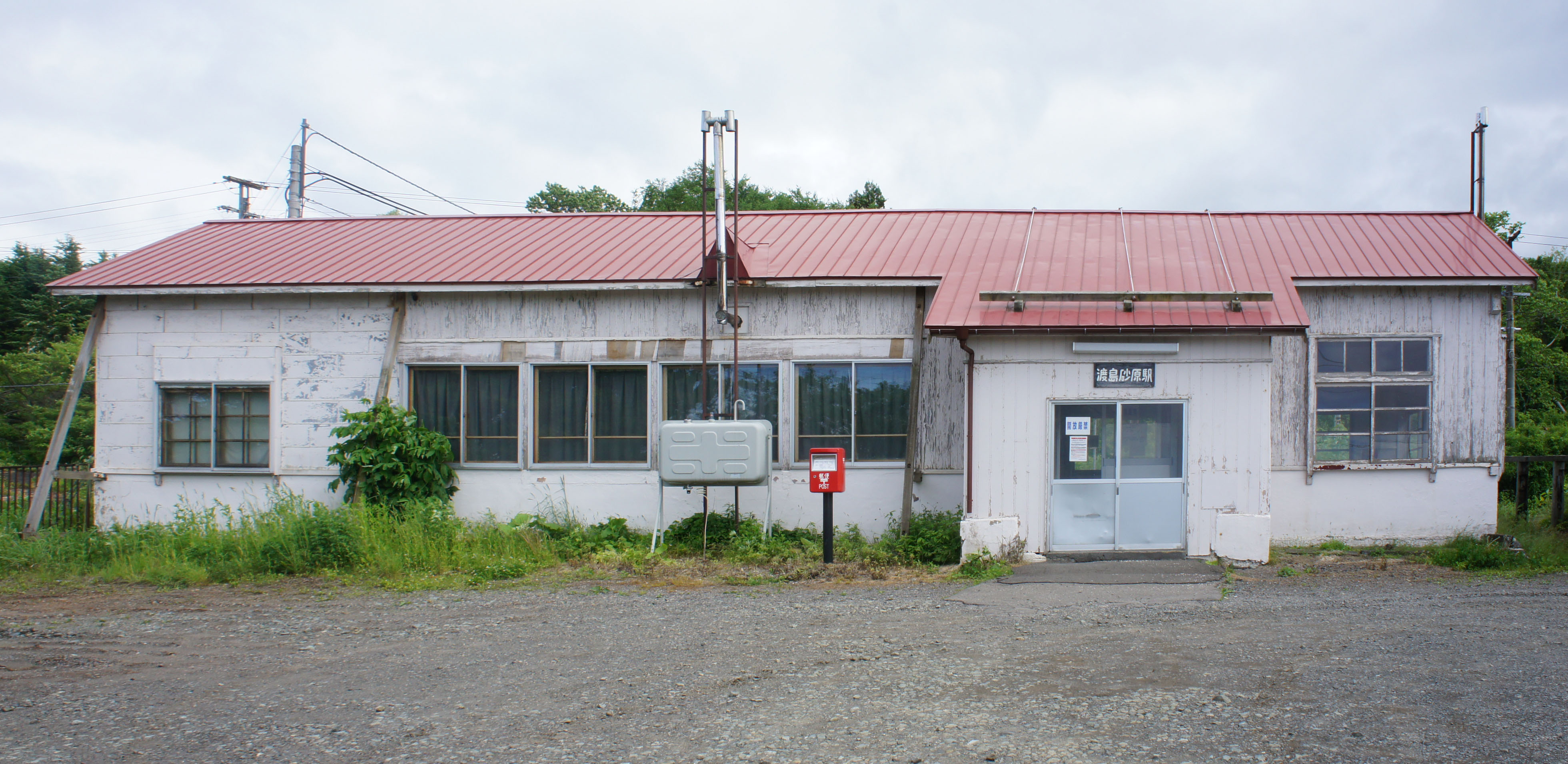
JR Hakodate-Main-Line, Oshima-Sawara Station building

== Lines ==
- Hokkaido Railway Company
  - Hakodate Main Line (Sawara branch line) Station N66

== Adjacent stations ==
«	Service	»
Hakodate Main Line (Sawara branch line)
Oshima-Numajiri	-	Kakarima
