= Hon-Ishikura Station =

Railway station in Mori, Hokkaido, Japan

Coordinates: 42.1586°N 140.4731°E

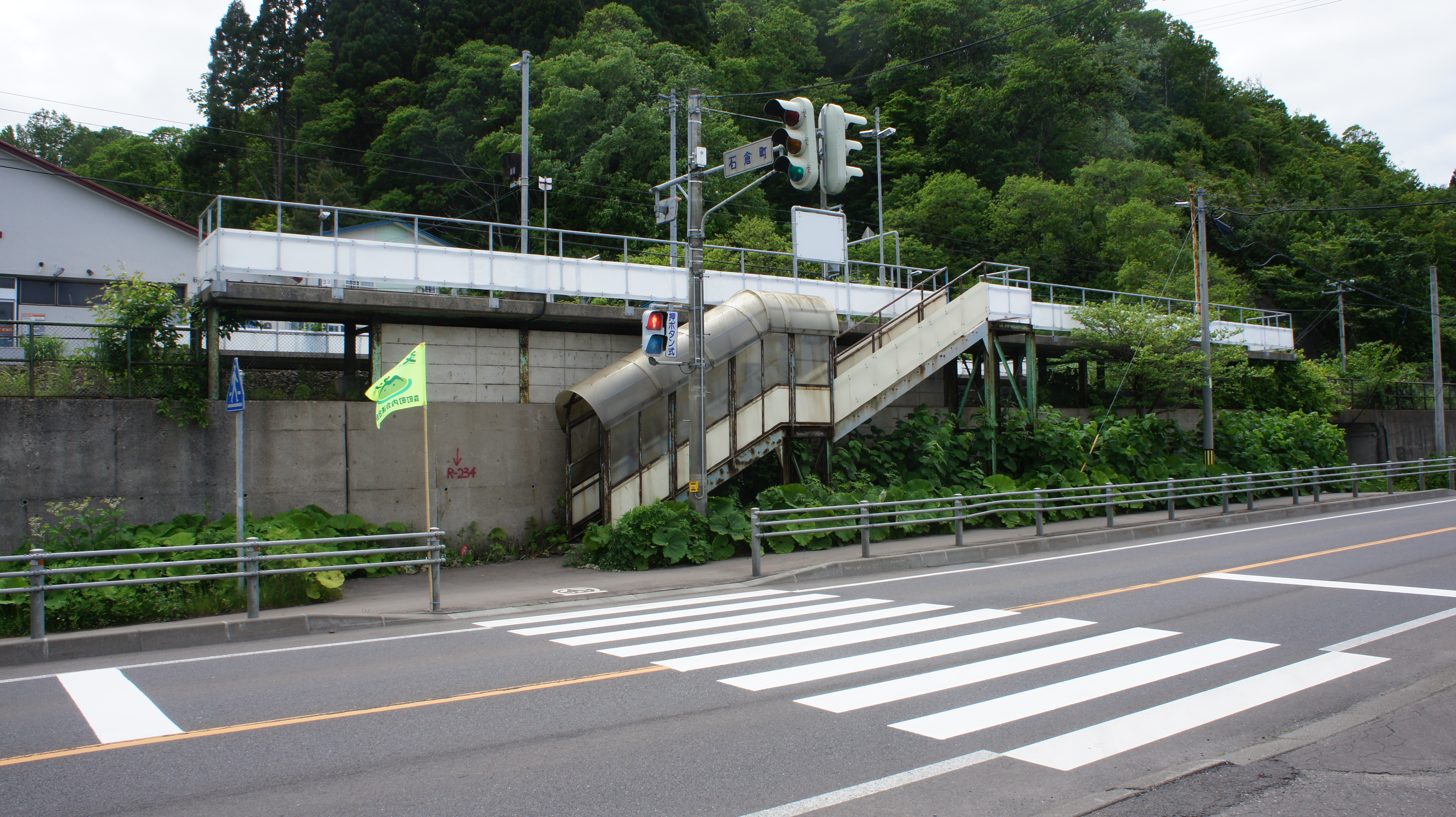
Station exterior

Hon-Ishikura Station (本石倉駅, Hon-Ishikura-eki) was a railway station in Mori, Kayabe District, Hokkaidō Prefecture, Japan. The station closed on March 12, 2022.

== Lines ==
- Hokkaido Railway Company
  - Hakodate Main Line Station H59
