= Higashi-Mori Station =

Railway station in Mori, Hokkaido, Japan

Coordinates: 42.1068°N 140.5942°E

Higashi-Mori Station (東森駅, Higashi-Mori-eki) is an unattended railway station in Mori, Kayabe District, Hokkaidō, Japan.

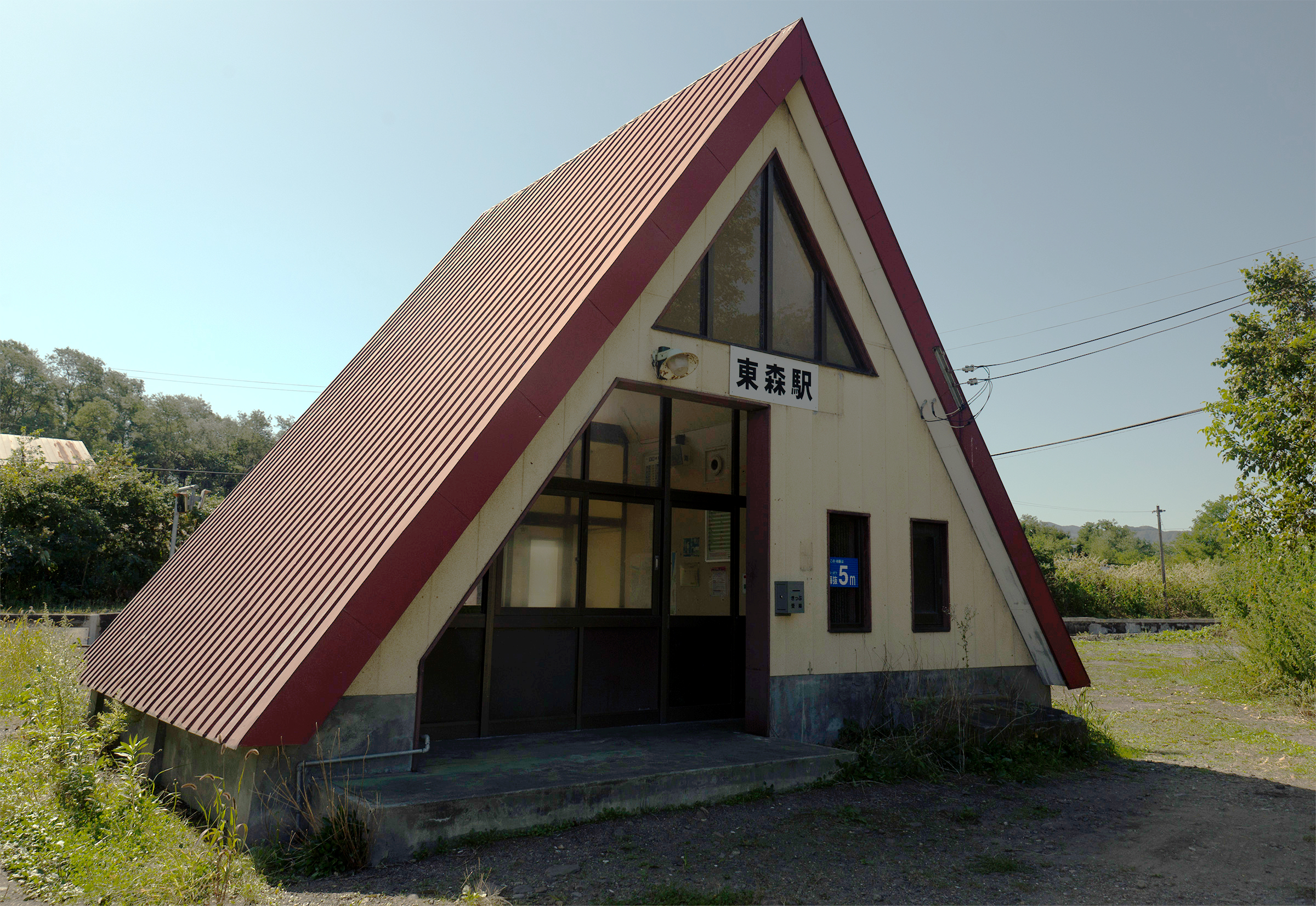
JR Higashi Mori station building

== Lines ==
- Hokkaido Railway Company
  - Hakodate Main Line (Sawara branch line) Station N63

== History ==
The station opened in 1927. It was transferred to the JNR in 1949, and freight services were terminated in 1965.

== Adjacent stations ==
«	Service	»
Hakodate Main Line (Sawara branch line)
Oshironai	-	Mori
