= Katsuragawa =

Katsuragawa may refer to:

- Hiroshi Katsuragawa (1924–2011), Japanese artist
- Katsuragawa Hoshū (1751–1809), Japanese physician and scholar
- Yuto Katsuragawa (born 1998), Japanese professional golfer
- Katsuragawa Station
  - Katsuragawa Station (Kyoto), a railway station in Kyoto, Japan
  - Katsuragawa Station (Hokkaidō), a railway station in Mori, Hokkaidō, Japan
