= Ishiya Station =

Railway station in Mori, Hokkaido, Japan

Coordinates: 42.1361°N 140.5064°E

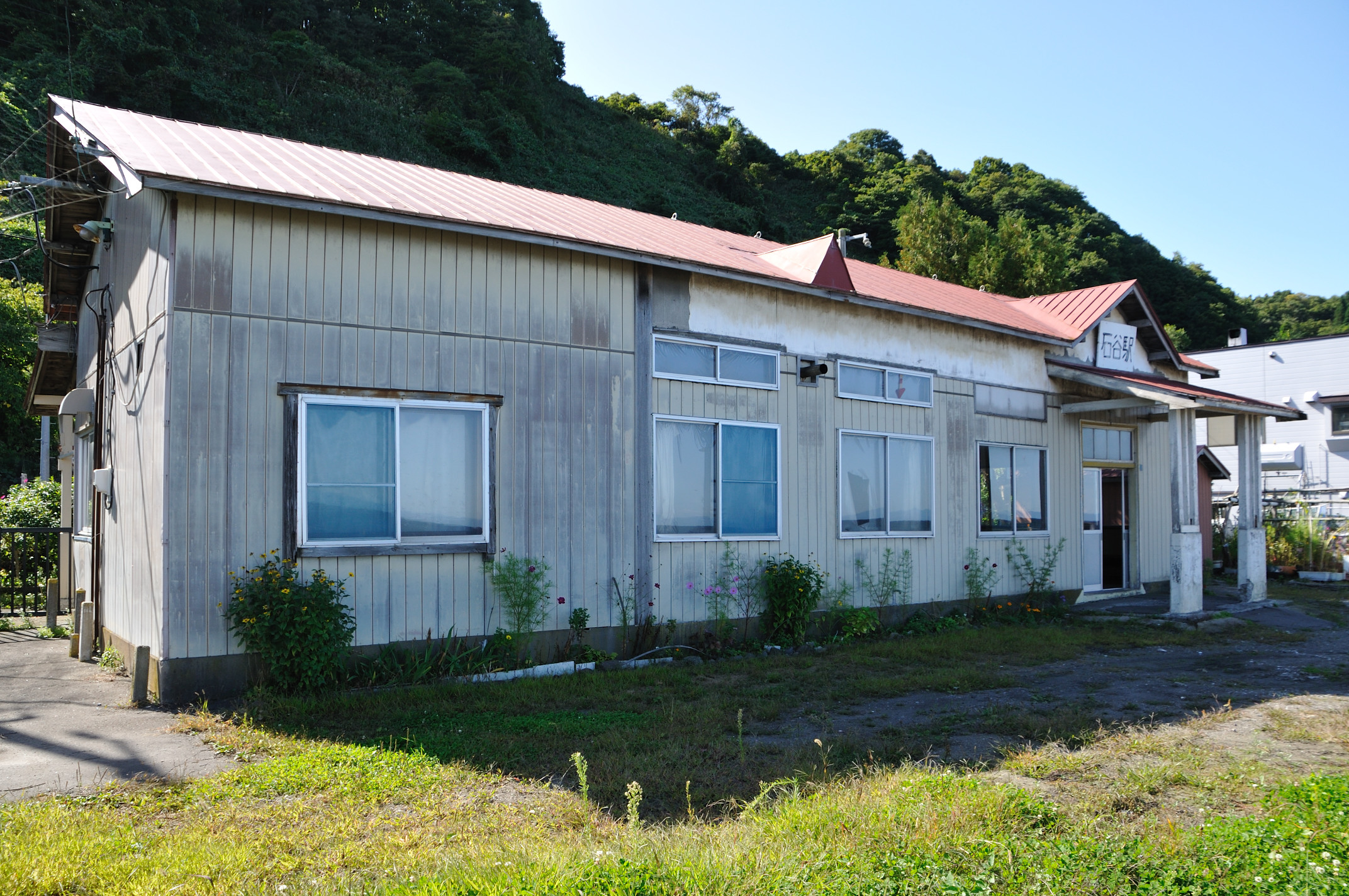
Station building

Ishiya Station (石谷駅, Ishiya-eki) was a railway station in Mori, Kayabe District, Hokkaidō Prefecture, Japan. The station closed on March 12, 2022.

== Lines ==
- Hokkaido Railway Company
  - Hakodate Main Line Station H60
