= Oshima-Numajiri Station =

Railway station in Mori, Hokkaido, Japan

Coordinates: 42.1069°N 140.7476°E

Oshima-Numajiri Station (渡島沼尻駅, Oshima-Numajiri-eki) is a railway station in Mori, Kayabe District, Hokkaidō, Japan.

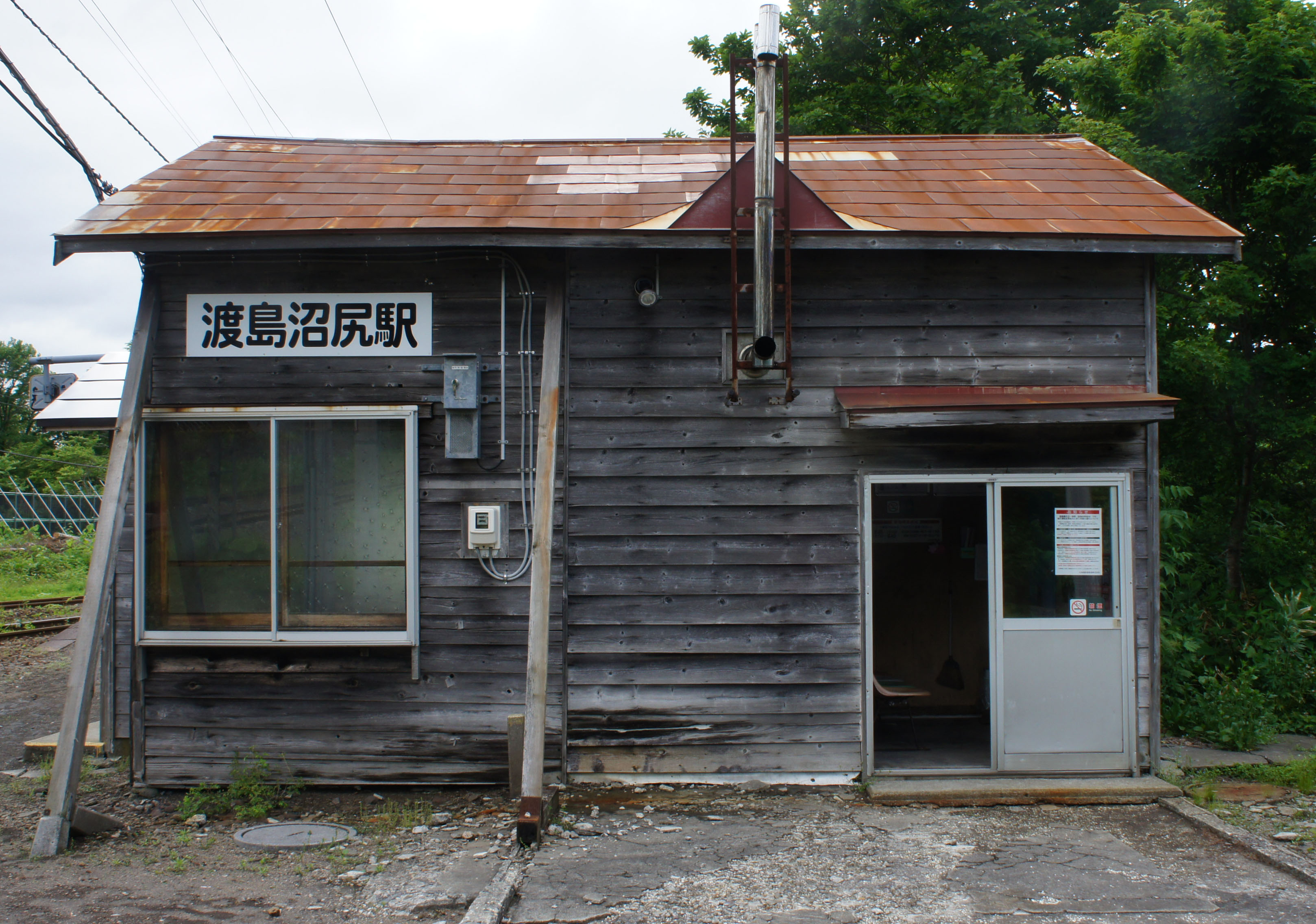
JR Hakodate-Main-Line, Oshima-Numajiri Station Building

== Lines ==
- Hokkaido Railway Company
  - Hakodate Main Line (Sawara branch line) Station N67

== Adjacent stations ==
«	Service	»
Hakodate Main Line (Sawara branch line)
Shikabe	-	Oshima-Sawara
