= Kakarima Station =

Railway station in Mori, Hokkaido, Japan

Coordinates: 42.1190°N 140.6461°E

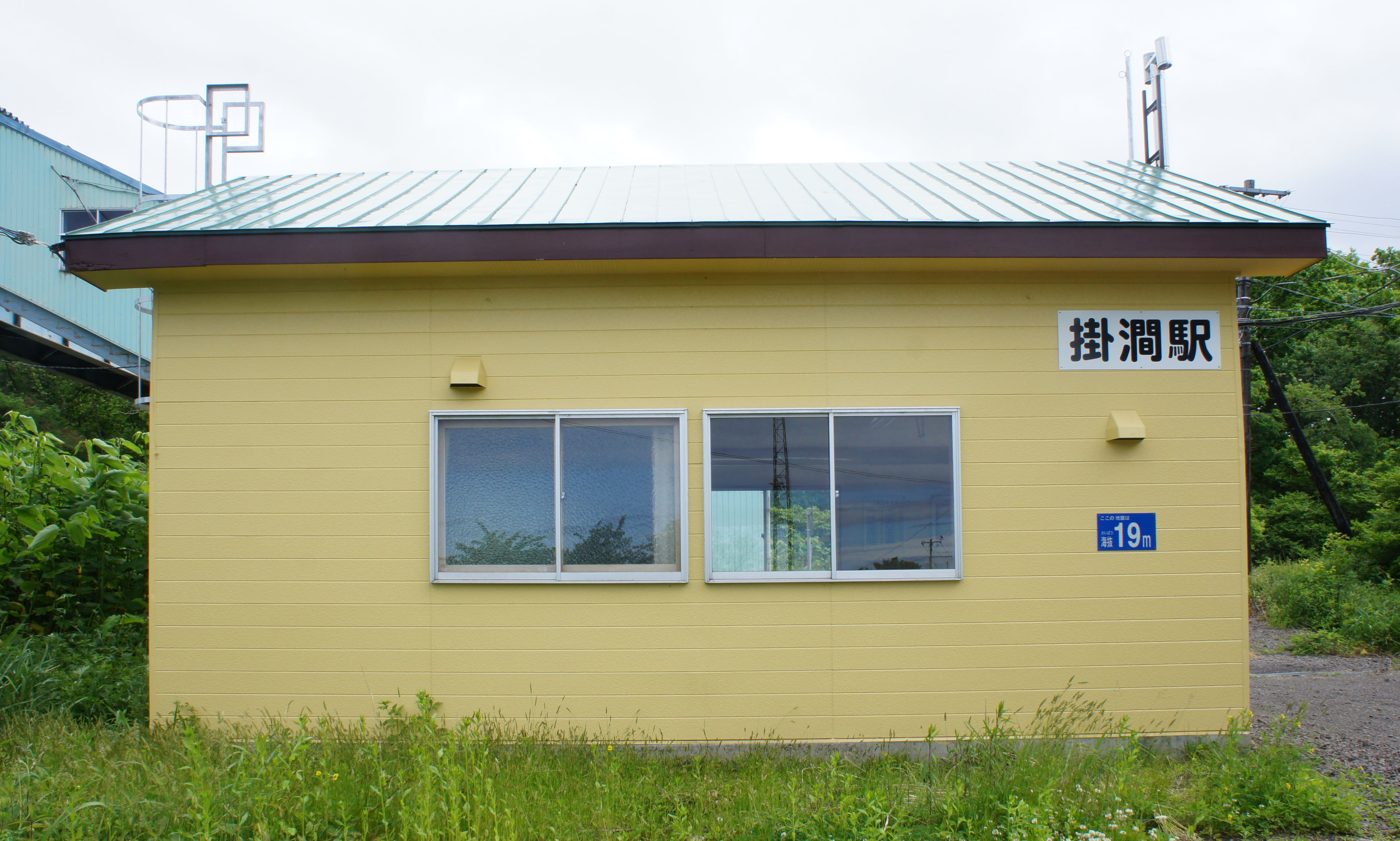
JR Hakodate-Main-Line, Kakarima Station building

Kakarima Station (掛澗駅, Kakarima-eki) is a railway station in Mori, Kayabe District, Hokkaidō, Japan.

== Lines ==
- Hokkaido Railway Company
  - Hakodate Main Line (Sawara branch line) Station N65

== Adjacent stations ==
«	Service	»
Hakodate Main Line (Sawara branch line)
Oshima-Sawara	-	Oshironai
