= Hokkaido Koma-ga-take =

Andesitic stratovolcano on the island of Hokkaido

Mount Hokkaidō-Komagatake
- 北海道駒ヶ岳
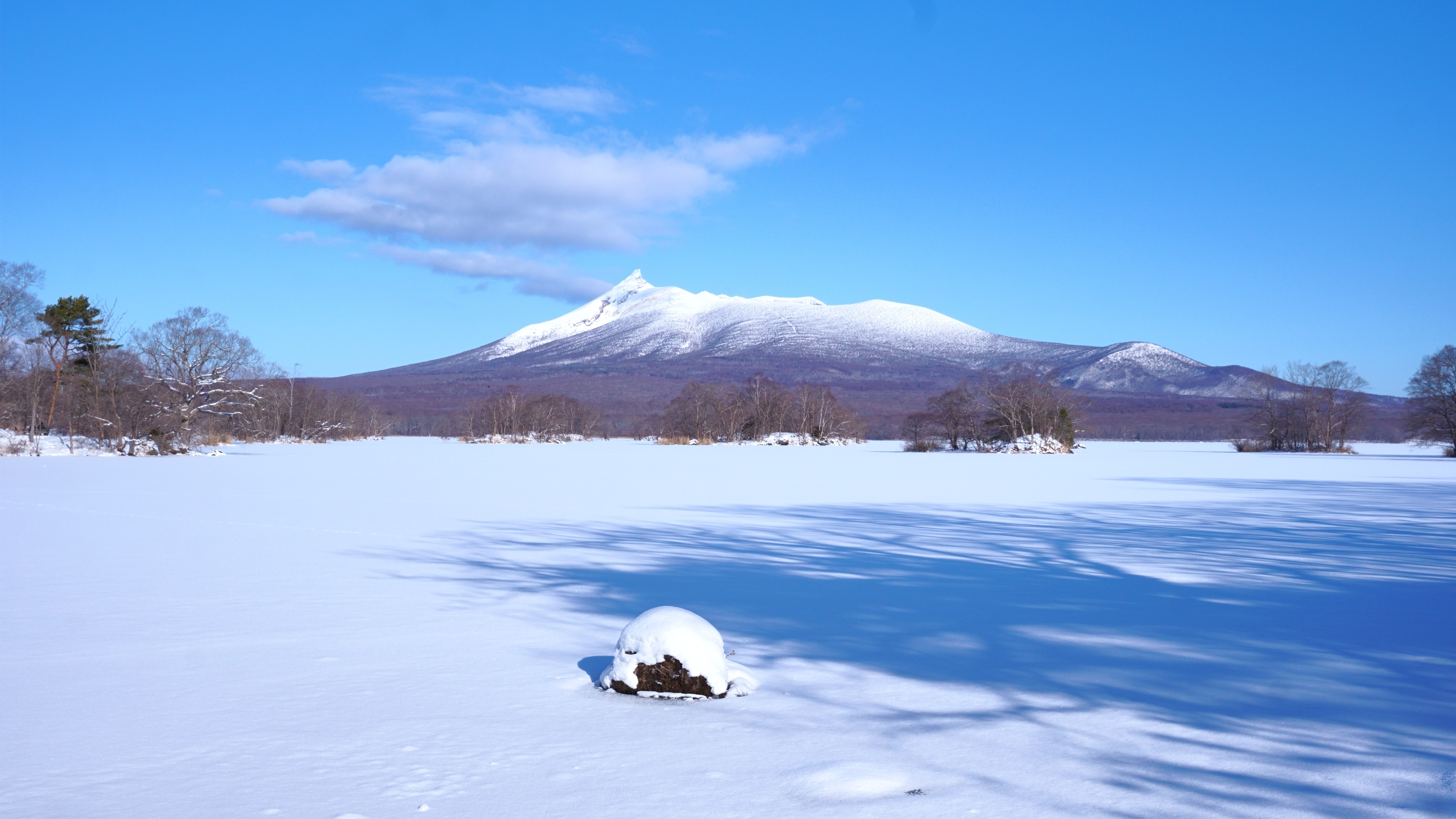
- View from Lake Ōnuma (January 2026)

Highest point
- Elevation: 1,131 m (3,711 ft)
- Listing: List of mountains and hills of Japan by height List of volcanoes in Japan
- Coordinates: 42°03′48″N 140°40′38″E

Naming
- Language of name: Japanese

Geography
- Location within Hokkaido
- Location: Hokkaidō, Japan
- Topo map(s): Geographical Survey Institute 25000:1 駒ヶ岳; 50000:1 室蘭

Geology
- Rock age: Quaternary
- Mountain type: stratovolcano
- Volcanic arc: Northeastern Japan Arc
- Last eruption: September to November 2000

Hokkaidō Koma-ga-take (北海道駒ヶ岳, Hokkaidō Koma-ga-take), also Oshima Koma-ga-take (渡島駒ヶ岳), Oshima Fuji (渡島富士), or just Koma-ga-take (駒ヶ岳) is a 1,131 metres (3,711 ft) andesitic stratovolcano on the border between Mori, Shikabe, and Nanae, all within the Oshima Subprefecture of Hokkaidō, Japan.

Occurrence of volcanic activity started some 30,000 years ago. Following roughly 5,000 years of dormancy, volcanic activity at Mount Koma-ga-take restarted in 1640. The 1640 eruption had an estimated volume of 2.9 km^{3} (0.70 mi^{3}) with a dense-rock equivalent of 1.1 km^{3} (0.26 mi^{3}). It also contained a debris avalanche which caused a tsunami, resulting in over 700 deaths. Runup heights of >8 m (26 ft) were recorded. Since then, there have been at least 50 recorded volcanic events at Mount Koma-ga-take.

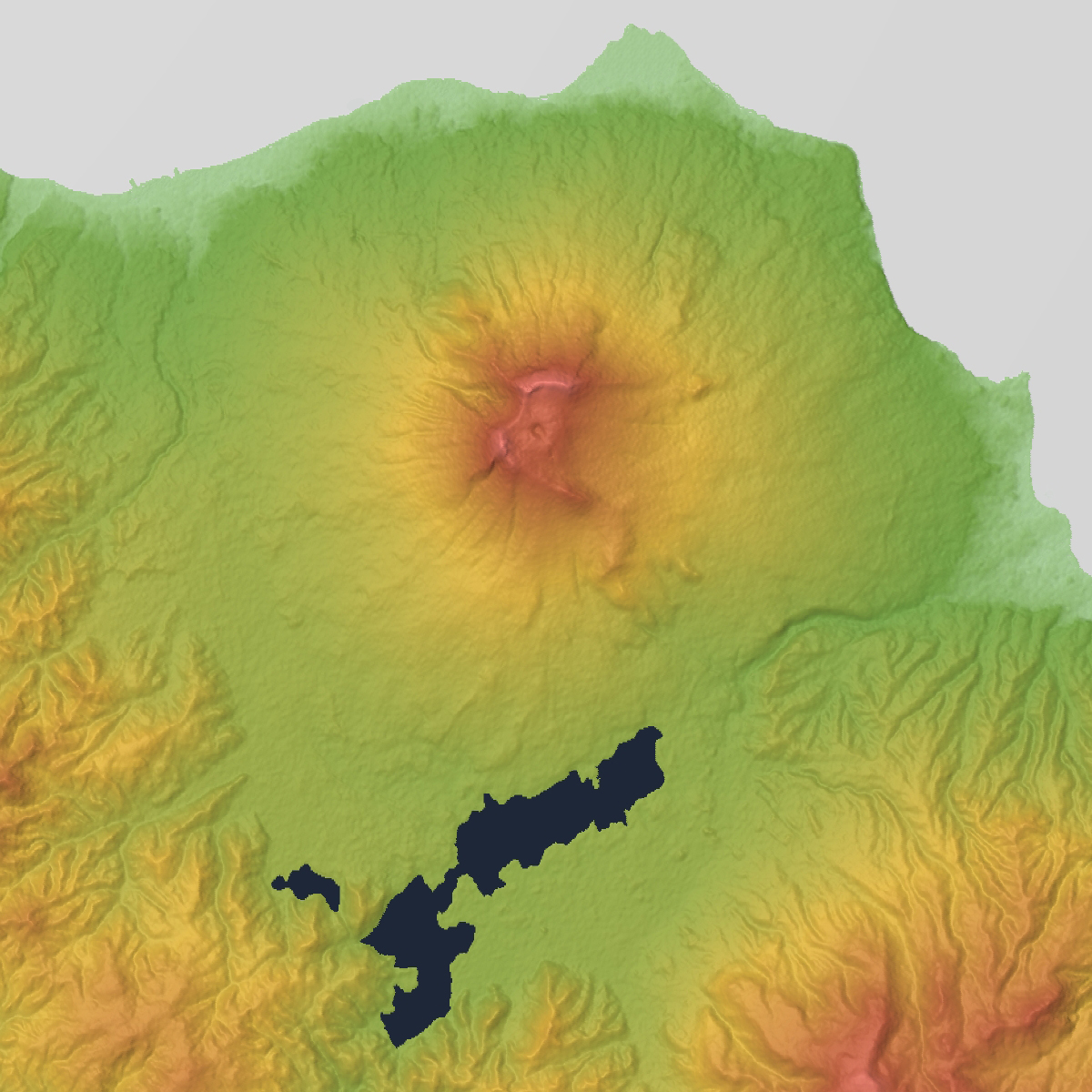
Relief Map

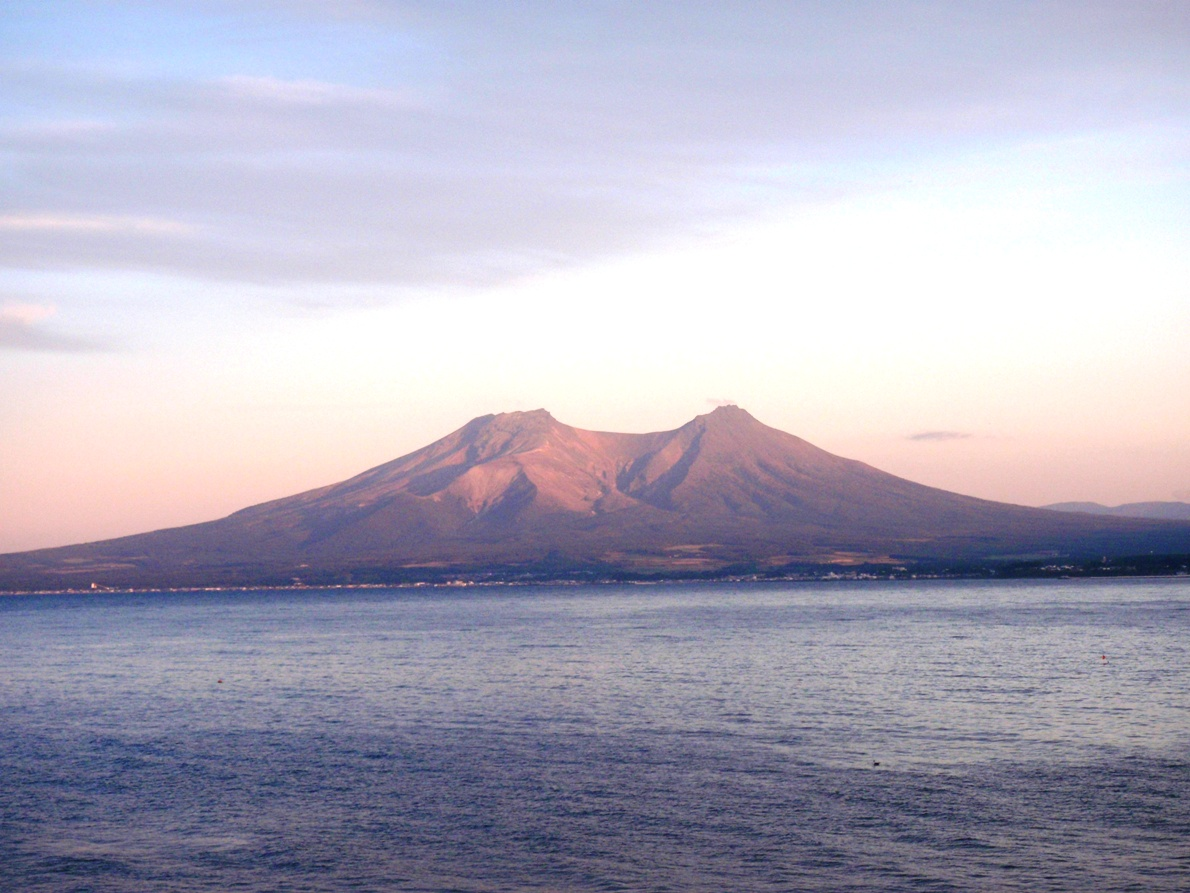
Viewed from NW.

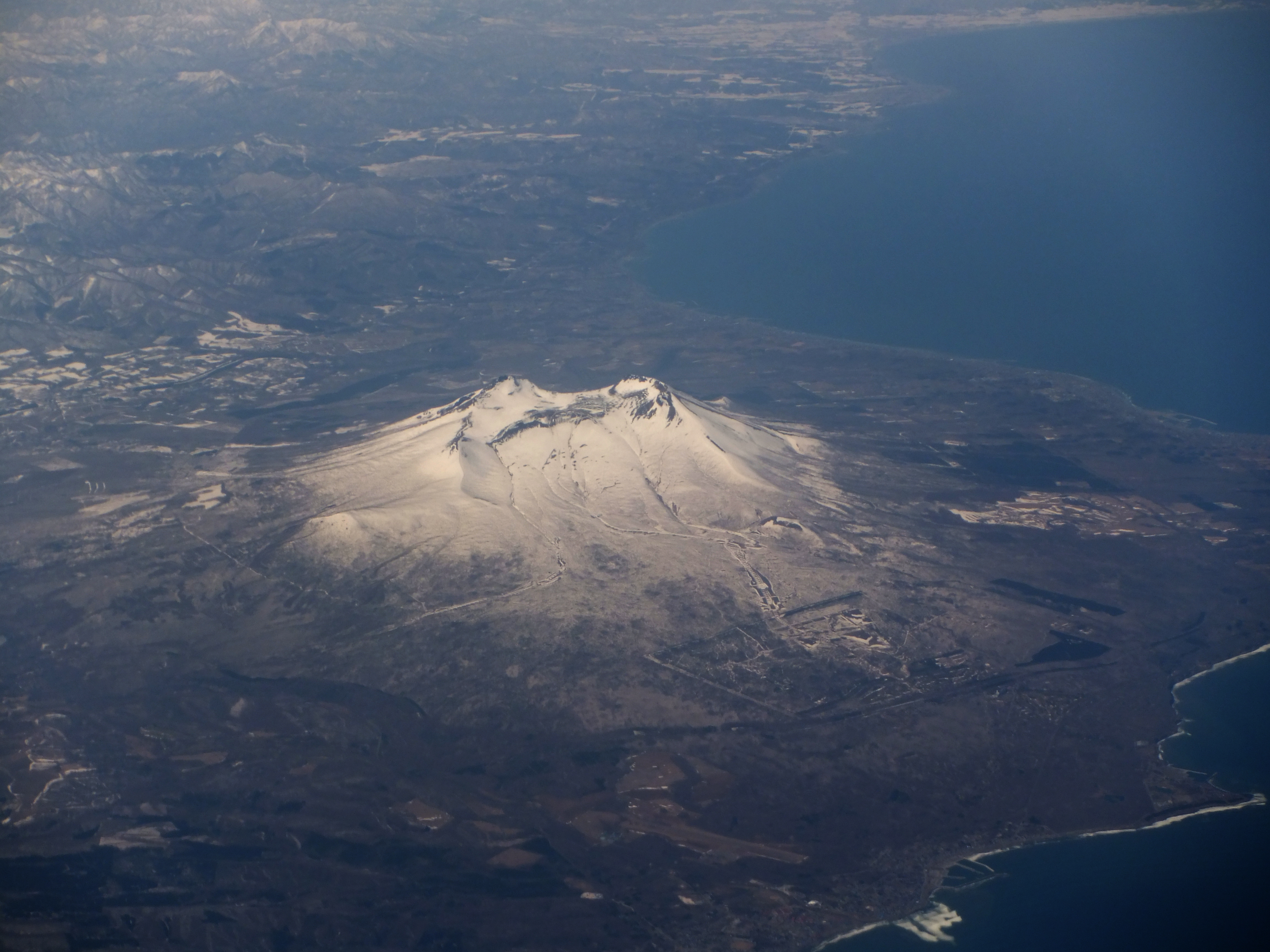
Viewed from ESE.

== See also ==
- Komagatake
