= Komagatake Station =

Railway station in Mori, Hokkaido, Japan

Komagatake Station 駒ヶ岳駅
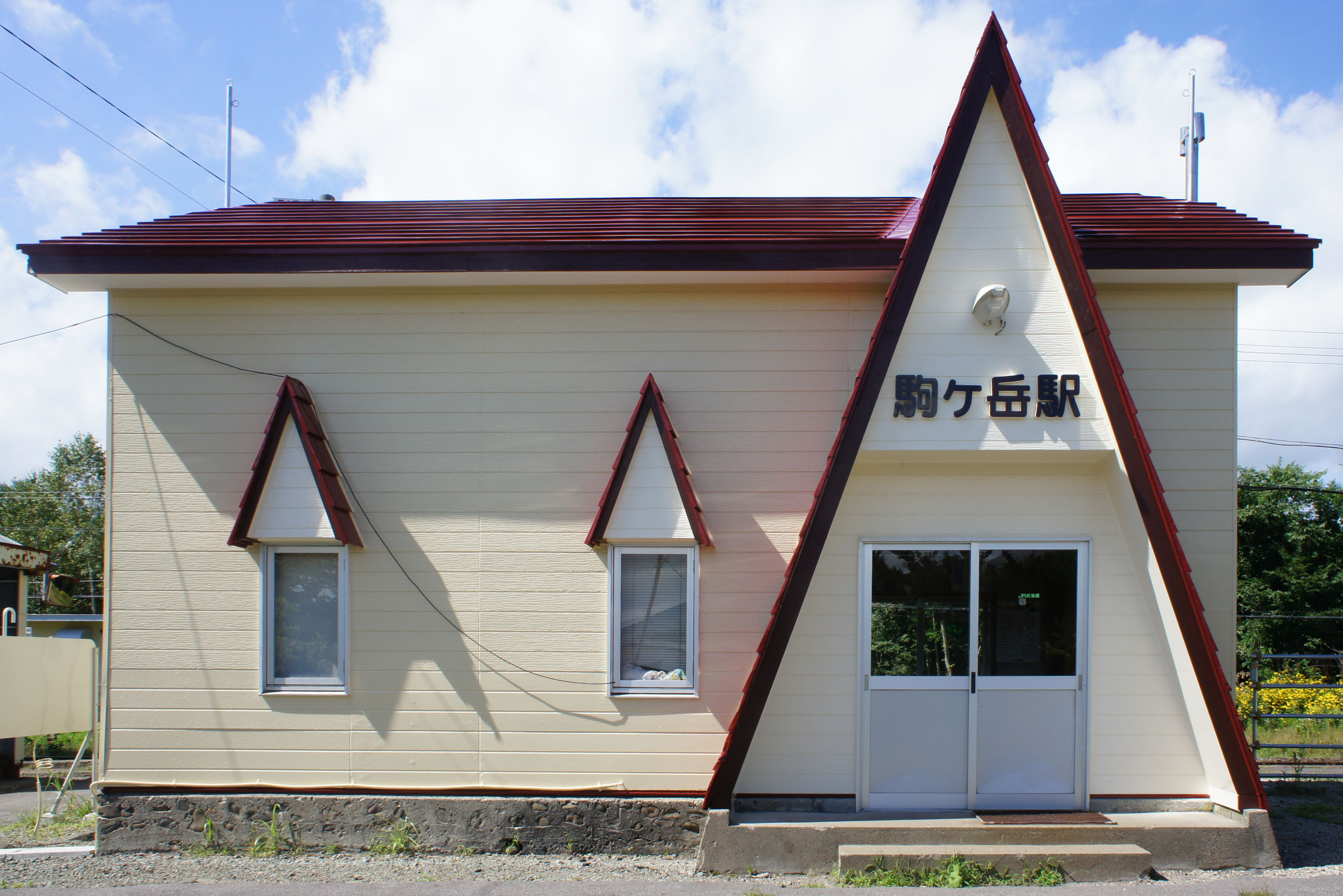

General information
- Location: Mori, Kayabe District, Hokkaidō Prefecture; Japan
- Coordinates: 42.0382°N 140.6108°E
- Operated by: JR Hokkaido
- Line: Hakodate Main Line

Other information
- Station code: H65
Location

Komagatake Station (駒ヶ岳駅, Komagatake-eki) is a railway station in Mori, Kayabe District, Hokkaidō Prefecture, Japan.

== Lines ==
- Hokkaido Railway Company
  - Hakodate Main Line Station H65

== Adjacent stations ==
«	Service	»
Hakodate Main Line
Akaigawa	Local	Mori
