= Akaigawa Station =

Railway station in Mori, Hokkaido, Japan

H66 Akaigawa Station 赤井川駅
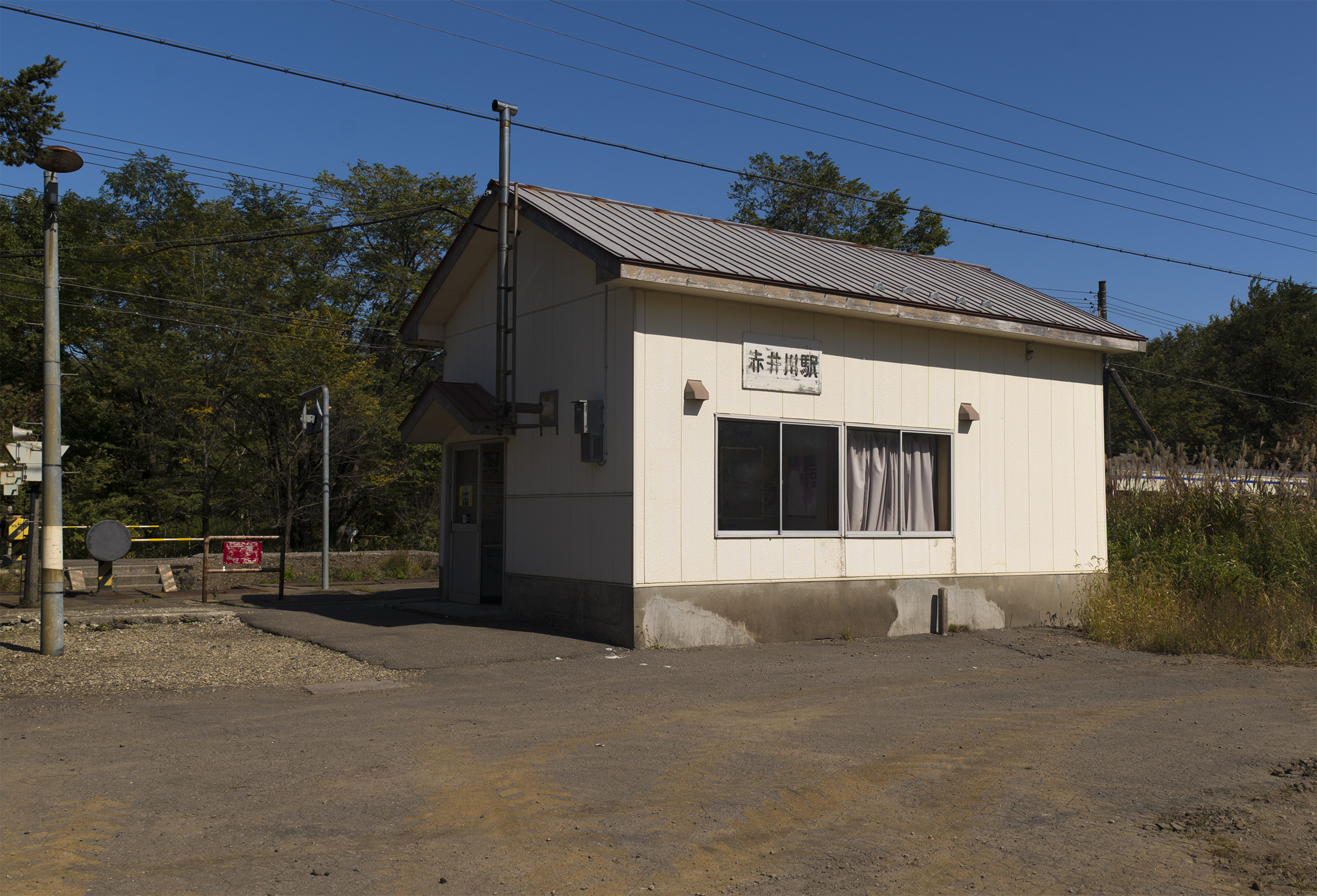

General information
- Location: Mori, Kayabe District, Hokkaidō Prefecture; Japan
- Coordinates: 42.0036°N 140.6422°E
- Operator: Hokkaido Railway Company
- Line: Hakodate Main Line

Construction
- Accessible: No

Other information
- Status: Unstaffed
- Station code: H66
Location

Akaigawa Station (赤井川駅, Akaigawa-eki) is a railway station in Mori, Kayabe District, Hokkaidō Prefecture, Japan.

== Lines ==
- Hokkaido Railway Company
  - Hakodate Main Line Station H66

== History ==
=== Future plans ===
In June 2023, this station was selected to be among 42 stations on the JR Hokkaido network to be slated for abolition owing to low ridership.

== Adjacent stations ==
«	Service	»
Hakodate Main Line
Ōnuma-Kōen	Local	Komagatake
