= Oshironai Station =

Railway station in Mori, Hokkaido, Japan

Coordinates: 42.1111°N 140.6133°E

Oshironai Station (尾白内駅, Oshironai-eki) is a railway station in Mori, Kayabe District, Hokkaidō, Japan.

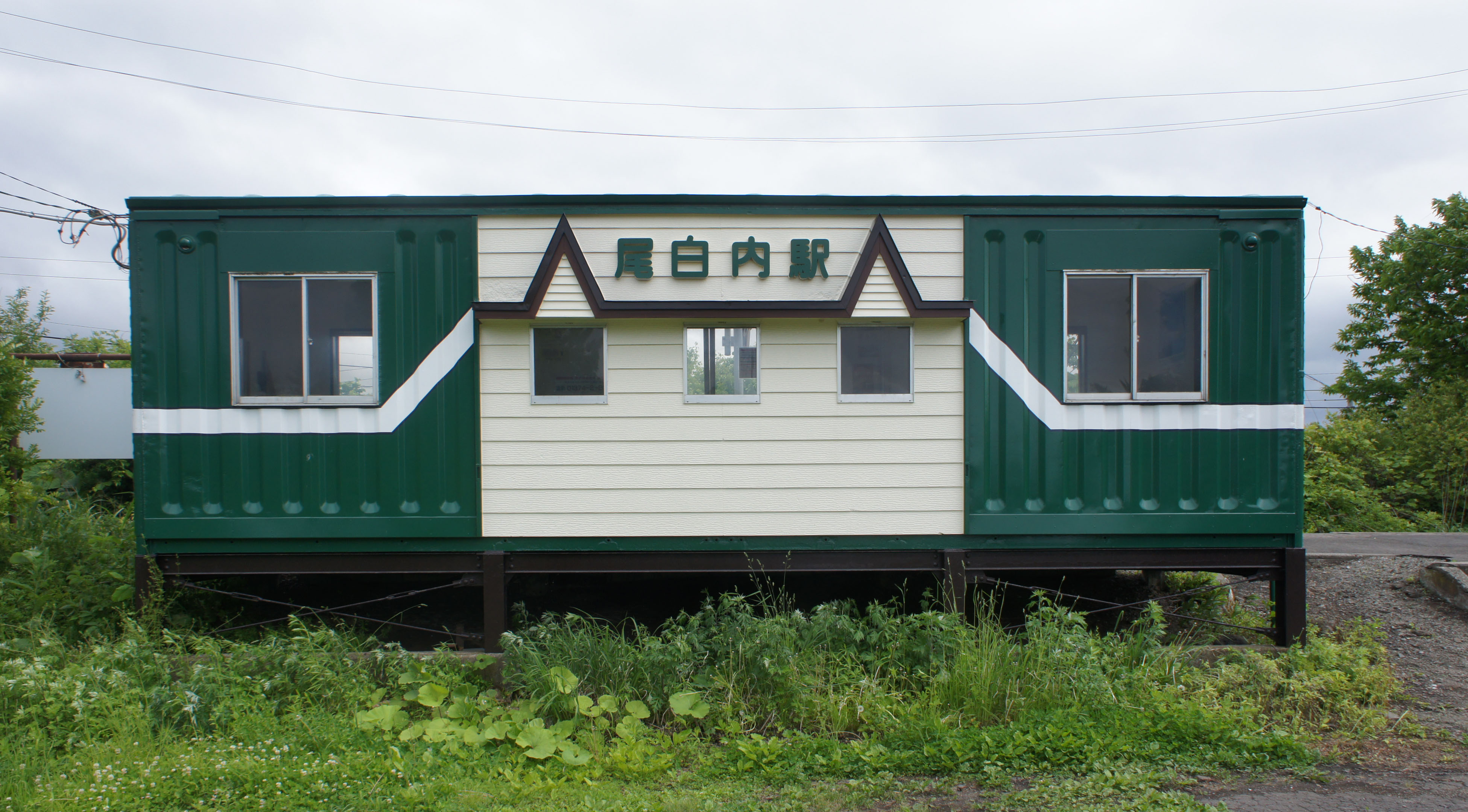
JR Hakodate-Main-Line, Oshironai Station Building

== Lines ==
- Hokkaido Railway Company
  - Hakodate Main Line (Sawara branch line) Station N64

== Adjacent stations ==
«	Service	»
Hakodate Main Line (Sawara branch line)
Kakarima	-	Higashi-Mori
