= 桂川駅 =

桂川駅 may refer to:

- Katsuragawa Station (disambiguation)
- Keisen Station
