= Katsuragawa Station (Hokkaido) =

Railway station in Mori, Hokkaido, Japan

Coordinates: 42°06′56″N 140°32′34″E

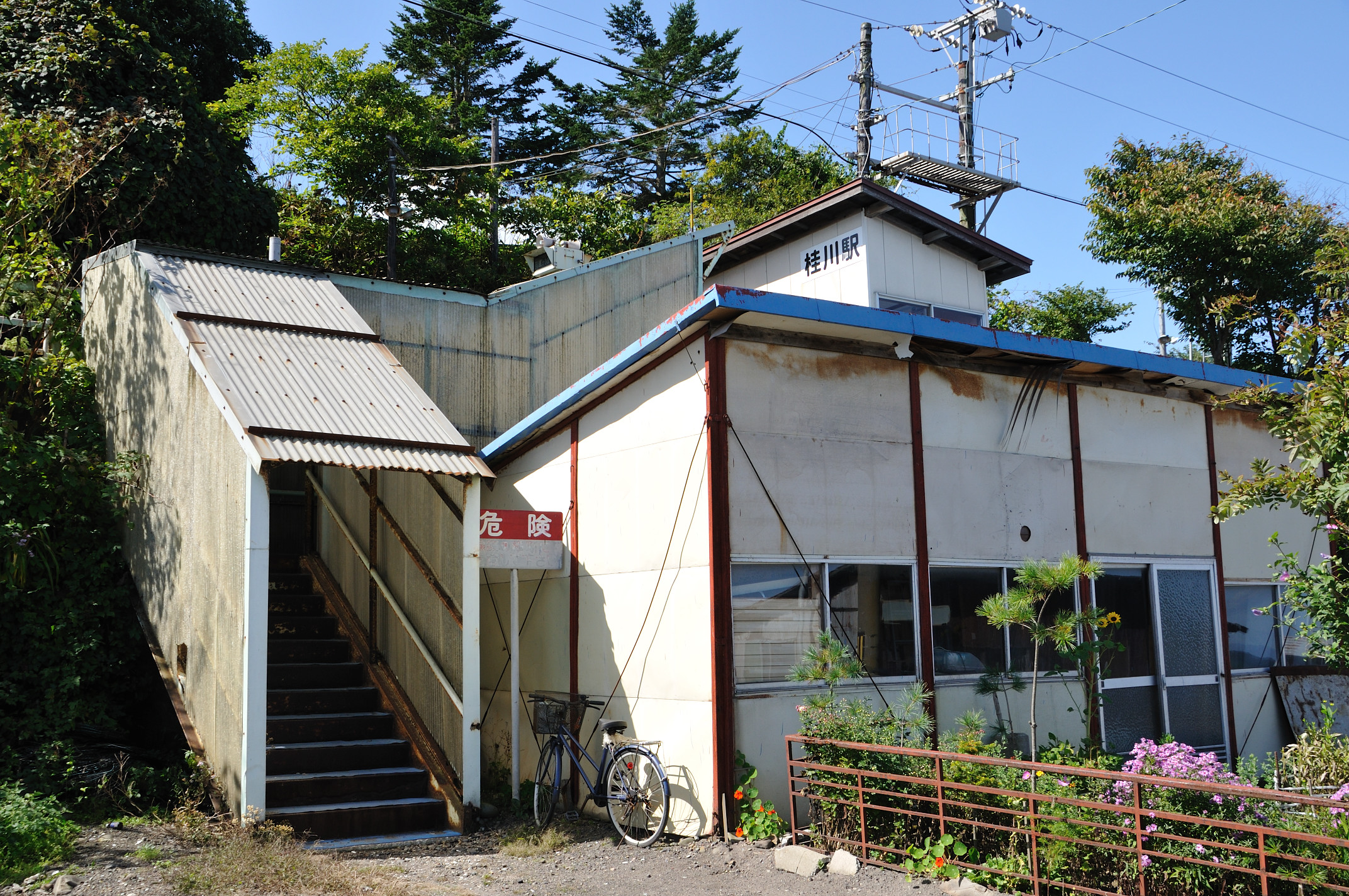
Entrance of Katsuragawa Station

Katsuragawa Station (桂川駅, Katsuragawa-eki) was a railway station on the Hakodate Main Line operated by Hokkaido Railway Company (JR Hokkaido) in Mori, Kayabe District, Oshima Subprefecture, Hokkaido, Japan. This station permanently closed on March 4, 2017.

== See also ==
- Katsuragawa Station (Kyoto)
