= Katsuragawa Station =

Katsuragawa Station may refer to:

- Katsuragawa Station (Kyoto), a railway station in Kyoto, Japan
- Katsuragawa Station (Hokkaidō), a railway station in Mori, Hokkaidō, Japan
