= Mori, Hokkaido =

Mori 森町
- Town
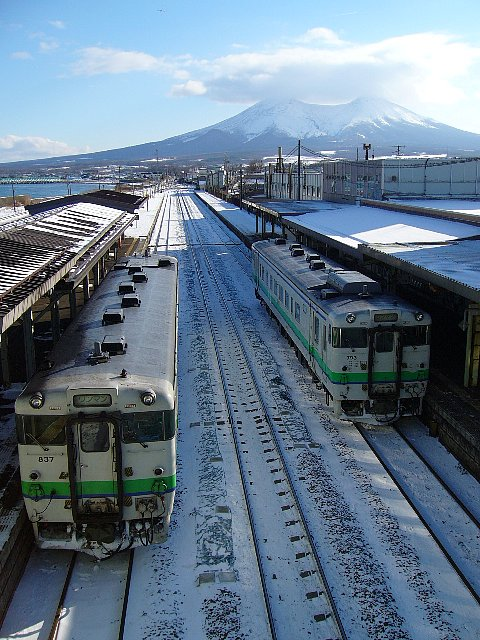
- Mori Station with Mount Komagatake in the background

- Flag Seal

- The location of Mori in Oshima Subprefecture.

- The location of Mori in Japan
- Coordinates: 42°6′N 140°35′E
- Country: Japan
- Prefecture: Hokkaido
- Subprefecture: Oshima Subprefecture
- District: Kayabe

Government
  - Mayor: Keizō Kajiya

Area
  - Total: 368.27 km^{2} (142.19 sq mi)

Population (2016-09-30)
  - Total: 16,299
  - Density: 44.258/km^{2} (114.63/sq mi)
- Post code: 049-2393
- Area code: 01374
- Government Office Address: Banchi 1, Aza Gokōmachi 144, Mori-machi, Kayabe-gun, Hokkaidō 049-2393
- Government Office Telephone: 01374-2-2181
- Community Identification Number: 01345-5
- Climate: Dfb
- Website: http://www.town.hokkaido-mori.lg.jp/
- Symbols
- Bird: Common gull
- Flower: Cherry blossom
- Tree: Chestnut

Mori (森町, Mori-machi) is a town located in Oshima Subprefecture, Hokkaido, Japan.

The total area of the town is 368.27 square kilometres (142.19 mi^{2}). As of September 2016, the town had a population of 16,299, and a population density of 44 persons per km^{2}.

Mount Komagatake, an active volcano, is located to the east of Mori, and much of the town is part of Ōnuma Quasi-National Park. Mori is the home of ikameshi, a squid and rice dish invented in the mid-20th century.

== Etymology ==
The name of the town originates from the word "Oniushi", meaning "a forested area" in the Ainu language. In the Japanese language the name of the town is written as 森, meaning forest. The suffix "町", denoting town status in Japan, is pronounced as -chō in every municipality of Hokkaido with the exception of Mori, where it is read as -machi.

== Geography ==
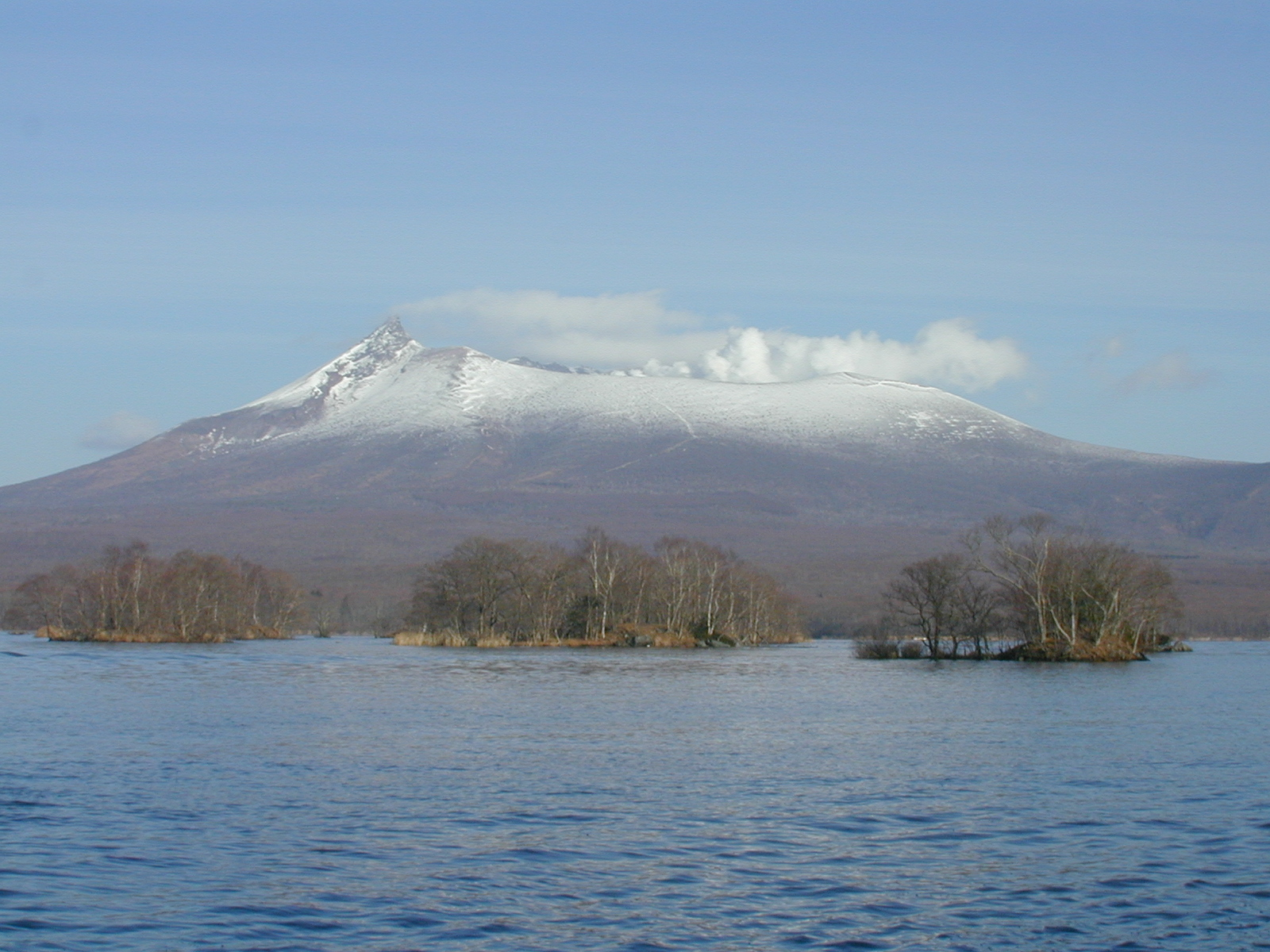
Mount Komagatake viewed from Ōnuma, Mori

Mori sits on the eastern coast of the Oshima Peninsula and overlooks Uchiura Bay (30 kilometres (19 mi) in diameter). The bay, also known as Funka Bay, is rich in squid and is the site of scallop aquaculture, both a mainstay of the town economy.

Much of the town of Mori is mountainous or hilly. Hokkaidō Komagatake 1,131 metres (3,711 ft) is an active andesitic stratovolcano on the east of Mori where the town borders the nearby municipalities of Shikabe and Nanae. Major eruptions of Komagatake are recorded as early as 1640, and ash fallout from the volcano is frequent. Mount Gujin (1,113) sits to the west. Volcanic ash from Komagatake covers the town and provides a rich soil for vegetable cultivation.

Mori is crossed by several small rivers, including the Torizaki River (20.8 kilometres (12.9 mi)), Oshironai River(12.6 kilometres (7.8 mi)), Katsura River (10.8 kilometres (6.7 mi)), Nigori River (10.6 kilometres (6.6 mi)), Shukunobe River (10.0 kilometres (6.2 mi)), and the 茂無部川 (9.5 kilometres (5.9 mi)).

Mori, along with the town of Nanae, shares a coastline on Lake Ōnuma (5.3 square kilometres (2.0 mi^{2})). Ōnuma, connected to Lake Konuma in Nanae, is technically a shallow pond. Ōnuma and Konuma, which sit at the southern foot of Mount Komagatake, were created when mudflows from an eruption of the mountain dammed the Orito River.

Komagatake, as well as Ōnuma and Konuma, are protected as part of Ōnuma Quasi-National Park (90.83 square kilometres (35.07 mi^{2})), which covers much of eastern Mori. The park is home to alpine plant species such as iwabukuro, a flowering plant of the family Scrophulariaceae, and urajirotade, a flowering plant of the family Polygonaceae. The middle reaches of Komagatake is home to stands of broadleaf trees, including mineyanagi, a species of willow, doronoki, a Populus species, birches, and mizunara, a species of oak. Ōnuma is home to watershields, carp, and wakasagi, a species of smelt used in Japanese cuisine.

=== Neighboring municipalities ===
The coast of Uchiura Bay forms the northern border of Mori. The town is bordered by five other municipalities by land: Hokuto and Nanae make up the town's broad southern border, Shikabe and Yakumo make up its short eastern and western borders respectively. Mori shares a border with Assabu to the southwest, high in the Oshima Mountain Range.

- Hiyama Subprefecture
  - Assabu
- Oshima Subprefecture
  - Hokuto
  - Nanae
  - Shikabe
  - Yakumo

=== Climate ===
Climate data for Mori, Hokkaido (2002−2020 normals, extremes 2002−present)
| Month | Jan | Feb | Mar | Apr | May | Jun | Jul | Aug | Sep | Oct | Nov | Dec | Year |
|---|---|---|---|---|---|---|---|---|---|---|---|---|---|
| Record high °C (°F) | 8.2 (46.8) | 11.9 (53.4) | 15.9 (60.6) | 23.0 (73.4) | 30.5 (86.9) | 29.4 (84.9) | 32.3 (90.1) | 33.6 (92.5) | 31.6 (88.9) | 25.5 (77.9) | 20.2 (68.4) | 13.5 (56.3) | 33.6 (92.5) |
| Mean daily maximum °C (°F) | −0.7 (30.7) | 0.1 (32.2) | 4.3 (39.7) | 10.7 (51.3) | 16.4 (61.5) | 20.3 (68.5) | 23.6 (74.5) | 25.4 (77.7) | 22.2 (72.0) | 15.8 (60.4) | 8.5 (47.3) | 1.7 (35.1) | 12.4 (54.2) |
| Daily mean °C (°F) | −3.7 (25.3) | −3.2 (26.2) | 0.7 (33.3) | 6.0 (42.8) | 11.2 (52.2) | 15.3 (59.5) | 19.2 (66.6) | 21.0 (69.8) | 17.5 (63.5) | 11.2 (52.2) | 4.7 (40.5) | −1.4 (29.5) | 8.2 (46.8) |
| Mean daily minimum °C (°F) | −8.0 (17.6) | −8.0 (17.6) | −3.6 (25.5) | 1.1 (34.0) | 6.2 (43.2) | 11.0 (51.8) | 15.6 (60.1) | 17.3 (63.1) | 13.0 (55.4) | 6.4 (43.5) | 0.4 (32.7) | −5.5 (22.1) | 3.8 (38.9) |
| Record low °C (°F) | −18.4 (−1.1) | −18.8 (−1.8) | −14.3 (6.3) | −6.8 (19.8) | −1.0 (30.2) | 2.7 (36.9) | 7.9 (46.2) | 9.3 (48.7) | 4.3 (39.7) | −1.5 (29.3) | −11.8 (10.8) | −14.5 (5.9) | −18.8 (−1.8) |
| Average precipitation mm (inches) | 48.4 (1.91) | 54.8 (2.16) | 62.5 (2.46) | 81.6 (3.21) | 77.0 (3.03) | 70.5 (2.78) | 106.0 (4.17) | 168.0 (6.61) | 122.3 (4.81) | 96.6 (3.80) | 109.2 (4.30) | 80.9 (3.19) | 1,074.8 (42.31) |
| Average snowfall cm (inches) | 128 (50) | 118 (46) | 80 (31) | 6 (2.4) | 0 (0) | 0 (0) | 0 (0) | 0 (0) | 0 (0) | 0 (0) | 19 (7.5) | 108 (43) | 465 (183) |
| Average rainy days | 10.0 | 10.2 | 11.3 | 10.3 | 9.9 | 8.1 | 8.7 | 10.5 | 10.2 | 11.5 | 13.0 | 12.5 | 126.2 |
| Average snowy days | 15.1 | 14.2 | 9.9 | 0.6 | 0 | 0 | 0 | 0 | 0 | 0 | 2.4 | 12.1 | 54.3 |
| Mean monthly sunshine hours | 82.1 | 84.9 | 135.1 | 176.8 | 198.1 | 158.1 | 134.5 | 148.4 | 162.4 | 154.3 | 96.1 | 75.0 | 1,608.9 |
Source 1: JMA
Source 2: JMA

== History ==
Mori was settled early in Japanese history as evidenced by the Jōmon-period archaeological sites now designated as the Washinoki Site. The town was settled by the Japanese in the 15th century. The settlement, like many other coastal areas of Hokkaido, was established as a Pacific herring fishing base. Fishermen operating out of Hakodate noted the richness of herring in the Mori area, and soon established a base in Mori. The base became the village of Washinoki, and was administered as part of Hakodate.

Kōbō Abe (1836 – 1908), a samurai and naval commander of the Tokugawa shogunate, lost the capitol at Edo to forces loyal to the Meiji Emperor as 1868 as part of the Boshin War (1868 – 1869). Enomoto fled from Edo and landed his fleet of eight steam warships, the remainder of the Tokugawa Navy, a Washinoki en route to establishing a base at Hakodate. The present-day town of Mori became part of Enomoto's Republic of Ezo. Enomoto and the republic were soon defeated in the Naval Battle of Hakodate (1869), and all of Hokkaido, including the villages of Mori, came under the rule of the central Japanese government. Mori was incorporated as a town in 1921. A great fire broke out in the town in 1961 and half of Mori was burned, with 554 homes destroyed . The town of Sawara (from Kayabe District) was merged into Mori on April 1, 2005.

== Economy ==
The fishing industry of Mori focuses on the aquaculture of scallops. The volcanic ash from Mount Komagatake has created a rich soil for fruit and vegetable production in Mori. The town is noted for its production of melons, tomatoes, pumpkins and prunes. Sawara is noted for its production of blueberries and at the town's Michi No Eki, you can sample blueberry jam and ice cream.

== Transportation ==
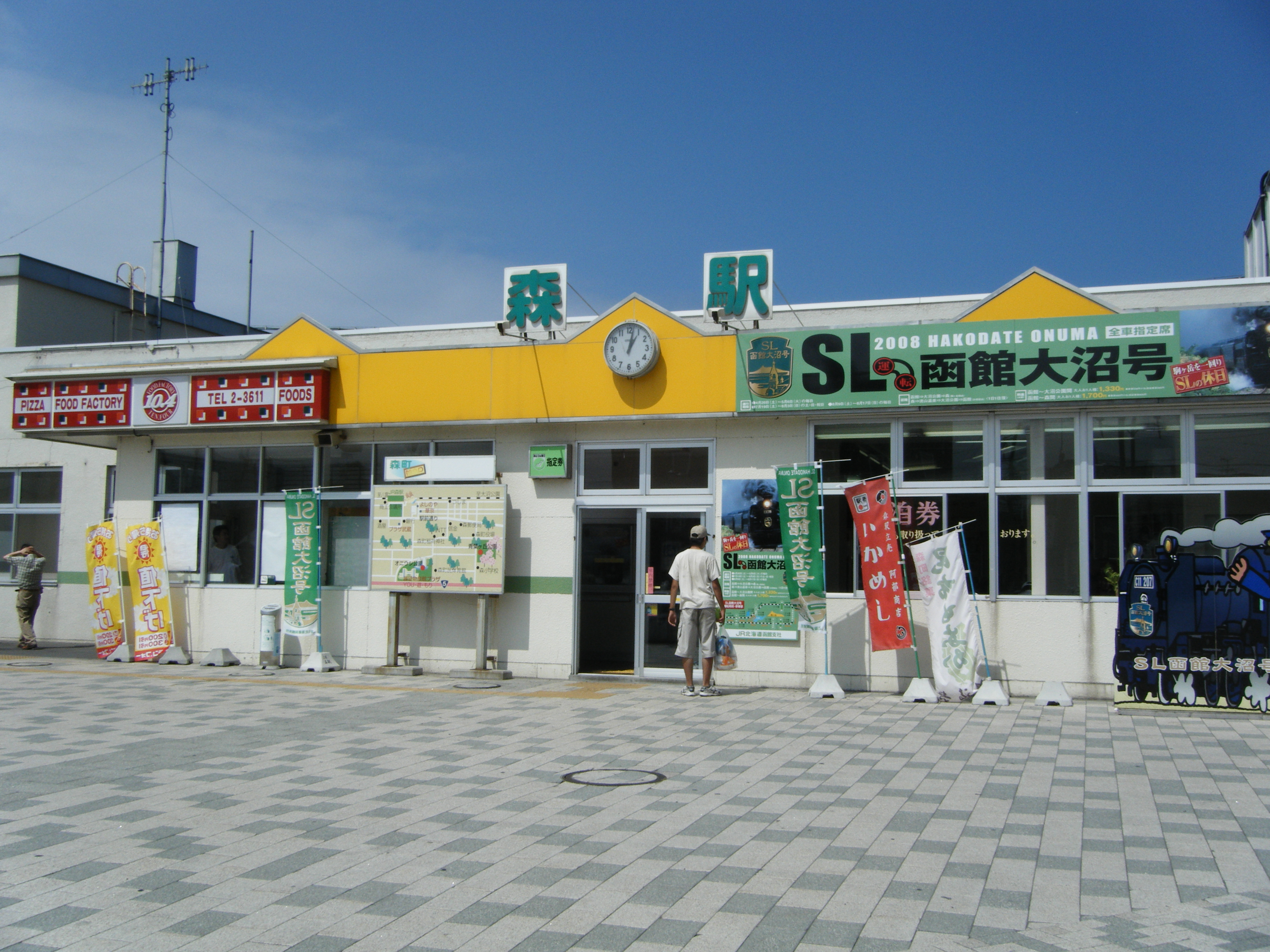
Mori Station

=== Rail ===
Mori is connected by rail via the JR Hokkaido Hakodate Main Line, which connects Hakodate to Sapporo, and continues to Asahikawa in north-central Hokkaido. Stations along the Hakodate Main Line in Mori were completed between 1903 and 1904. Mori Station serves the central business and administrative district of the town.

The Sawara Branch Line, which runs between Mori Station and Ōnuma Station in Nanae, serves several small stations in the Sawara area. Stations along the Hakodate Main Line in Mori were completed in 1945.

- Hakodate Main Line
  - Stations: Akaigawa -- Komagatake -- Higashiyama -- Himekawa—Mori -- Katsuragawa -- Ishiya -- Hon-Ishikura -- Ishikura
- Sawara Branch Line
  - Stations: Oshima-Mumajiri -- Oshima-Sawara -- Kakarima -- Oshironai -- Higashi-Mori—Mori Station

=== Highways ===
Japan National Route 5, a national highway of Japan, runs through the town and is the main highway to Hakodate with the rest of Hokkaido. Route 5 runs north through Yakumo and Oshamanbe and then veers east towards the Shakotan peninsula and into the town Otaru before connecting to Sapporo. Japan National Route 229 was completed in 1971.

== Culture and cuisine ==
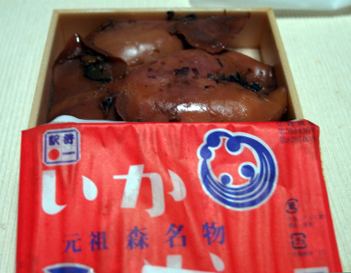
Ikameshi

=== Festivals ===
The annual town matsuri festival of Mori is held in early August. The festival is associated with the Mori Inari Shrine, and includes the carrying of mikoshi throughout the central Mori district, taiko drumming, and stalls serving ramen and other Japanese cuisine.

=== Ikameshi ===
Mori is the home of ikameshi, a dish composed of squid cooked with rice inside. Mori Station bentō vendor Abe Bentōten invented ikameshi in 1941 as a result of food rationing during World War II. Japanese flying squid were caught in plentiful supply near Mori, and used as a way to ration rice. The Abe Bentōten store continues as the Ikameshi Abeshoten Co., a bentō and prepared foods company, located in Mori, with a shop at Mori Station.

== Education ==
Mori is home to one high school, Mori Prefectural High School, a public high school operated by the Prefecture of Hokkaido. The high school was established in 1941 as a girl's high school run by the Town of Mori, but became a coeducation high school run by the prefecture in 1948.

The Town of Mori Board of Education maintains two middle schools: Mori Middle School and Sawara Middle School. The town is home to six elementary schools. There are several empty elementary school buildings due to the declining population of the town, the most recent closings being Ishikura elementary school in 2017 and Akaigawa elementary school in 2011.

== Services ==
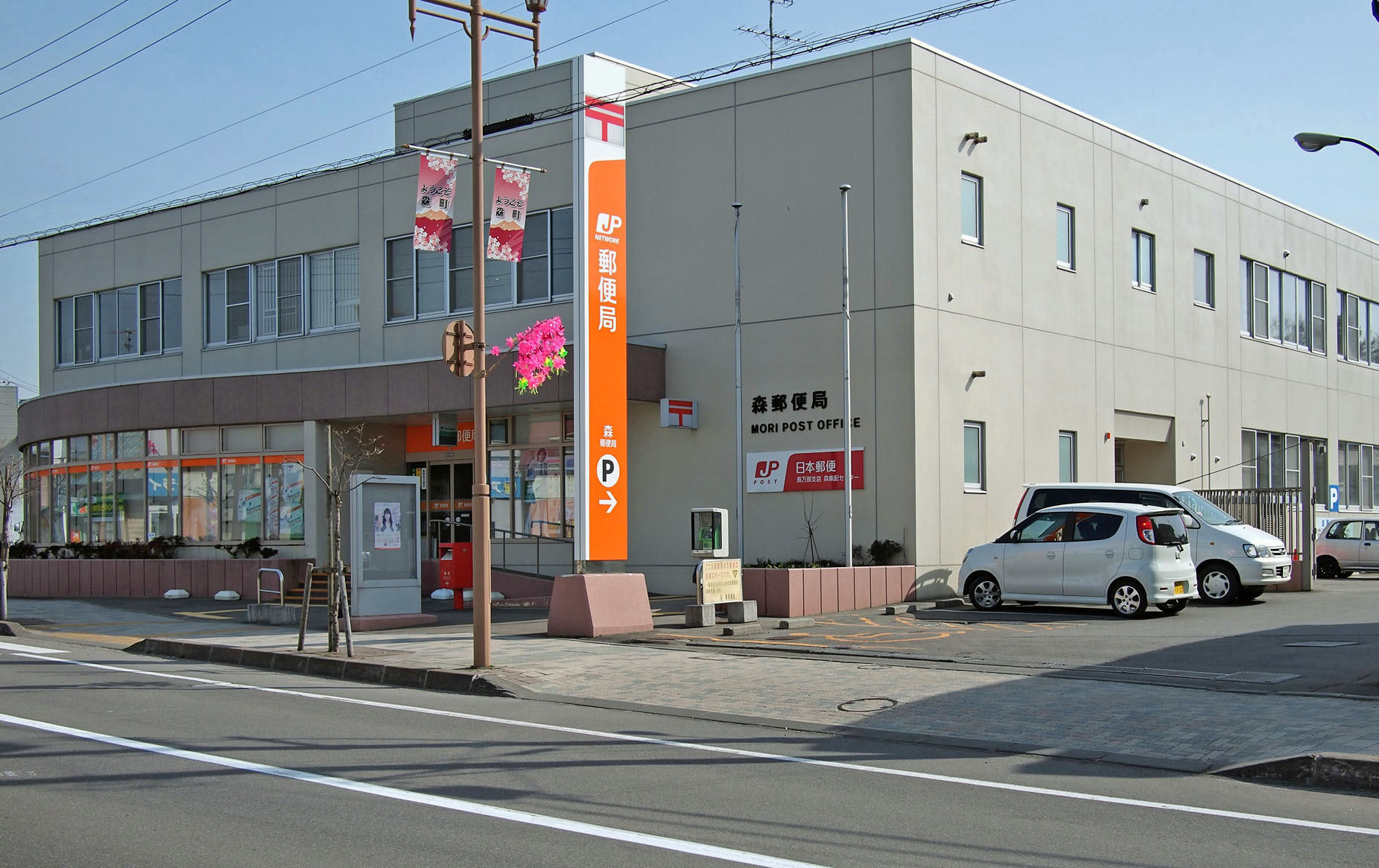
Mori Post Office

=== Post ===
The town of Mori is served by four post offices. The main post office is in the Miyukichō district, near the Mori Town Hall.

== Local government ==
Keizō Kajiya (b. 1956), a graduate of Ashikaga Institute of Technology and mayor of the former town of Sawara, was elected mayor of Mori on October 16, 2012.

== See also ==
- Jōmon Archaeological Sites in Hokkaidō, Northern Tōhoku, and other regions
