= Shikabe, Hokkaido =

Shikabe 鹿部町
- Town

Japanese transcription(s)
  - Hepburn romanization: Shikabe-chō
- Flag Seal

- The location of Shikabe in Oshima Subprefecture.

- The location of Shikabe in Japan
- Coordinates: 42°2′N 140°49′E
- Country: Japan
- Prefecture: Hokkaido
- Subprefecture: Oshima Subprefecture
- District: Kayabe

Government
  - Mayor: Akihiko Morita (盛田昌彦)

Area
  - Total: 110.61 km^{2} (42.71 sq mi)

Population (2019-08-01)
  - Total: 3,920
  - Density: 35.4/km^{2} (91.8/sq mi)
- Post code: 041-1498
- Area code: 01343
- Official Tree: Japanese Rowan
- Official Flower: Rhododendron
- Government Office Address: Aza Miyahama 299, Shikabe-chō, Kayabe-gun, Hokkaidō 041-1498
- Government Office Telephone: 01372-7-2111
- Community Identification Number: 01343-9
- Website: https://www.town.shikabe.lg.jp/

Shikabe (鹿部町, Shikabe-chō) is a town located in Oshima Subprefecture, Hokkaido, Japan.

The town has a total area of 110.61 square kilometres (42.71 mi^{2}).

== Geography ==
Shikabe is located in northeast of Oshima Peninsula. There is Hokkaido Koma-ga-take on northwest of the town.

The name of "Shikabe" is derived from Ainu word "sikerpe", meaning "Place with Phellodendron amurense".

=== Neighboring municipalities ===
- Hakodate
- Mori
- Nanae

== Demographics ==
On August 1, 2019, the town had an estimated population of 3,920 and a density of 37 persons per km^{2}.

== History ==
- 1666: Ito Genguro, Shogunate of Tsugaru, discovers a deer healing itself in a hot spring in the area now called Shikabe. The legend of Shikabe Onsen begins.
- 1906: Shikabe became a Second Class village.
- 1945: Hakodate Main Line Sawara Branch Line and Shikabe Station were opened.
- 1983: Shikabe village became Shikabe town.
- 1990: The founding of Shikabe Park.

== Education ==
- Shikabe Elementary School
- Shikabe Junior High School

== Economy ==
The economy of Shikabe is dominated by fishing, with 3 large and small fishing ports in the town. The sea animals fished in Shikabe are octopus, pleuronectidae (righteyed flounder), okhotsk atka mackerel, salmon, as well as sea cucumber. During the wintertime, Shikabe's famous pollack roe is produced.

Besides fishing, Shikabe has many onsen, as well as a Michi no Eki where visitors can relax with a warm foot bath. In the general area, there are various hotels and ryokan for visitors to stay at.

=== Fisheries ===
- Honbetsu Fishery
- Shikabe Fishery

=== Post Offices ===
- Shikabe Post Office

=== Delivery Companies ===
- Japan Post
- Segawa
- Yamato

== Transportation ==
- Hakodate Bus: Shikabe Branch Office
- Hakodate Main Line: Shikabe Station
- Japan National Route 278
