= Oshima Subprefecture =

Coordinates: 41°49′11″N 140°45′12″E

Oshima Subprefecture 渡島総合振興局
- Oshima-sōgō-shinkō-kyoku
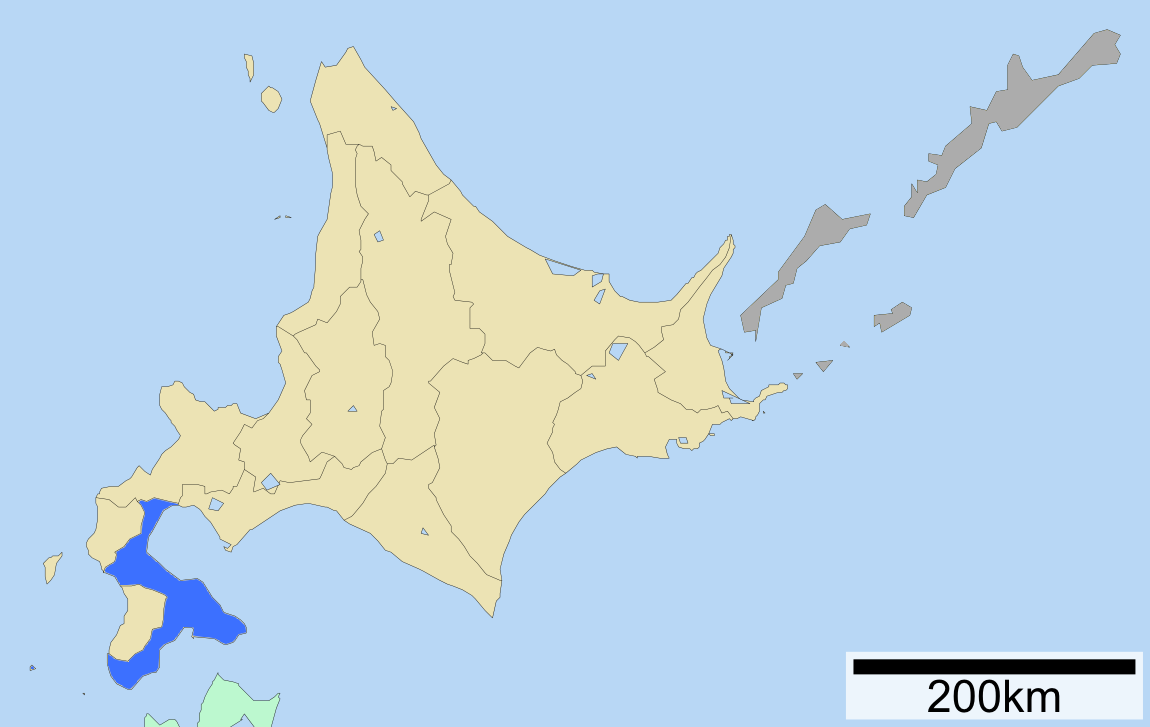
- Prefecture: Hokkaido
- Capital: Hakodate

Area
  - Total: 3,936.32 km^{2} (1,519.82 sq mi)

Population (March 2009)
  - Total: 449,371
  - Density: 110/km^{2} (300/sq mi)
- Website: oshima.pref.hokkaido.lg.jp

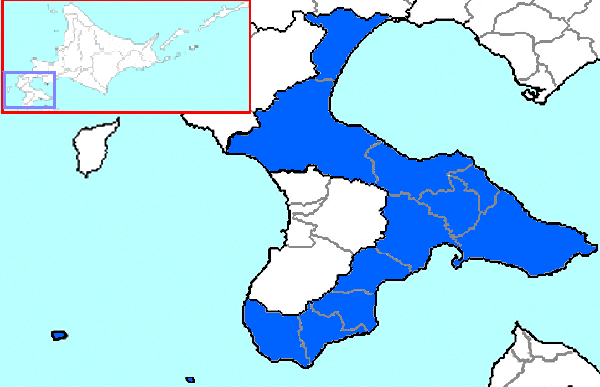
Oshima Subprefecture

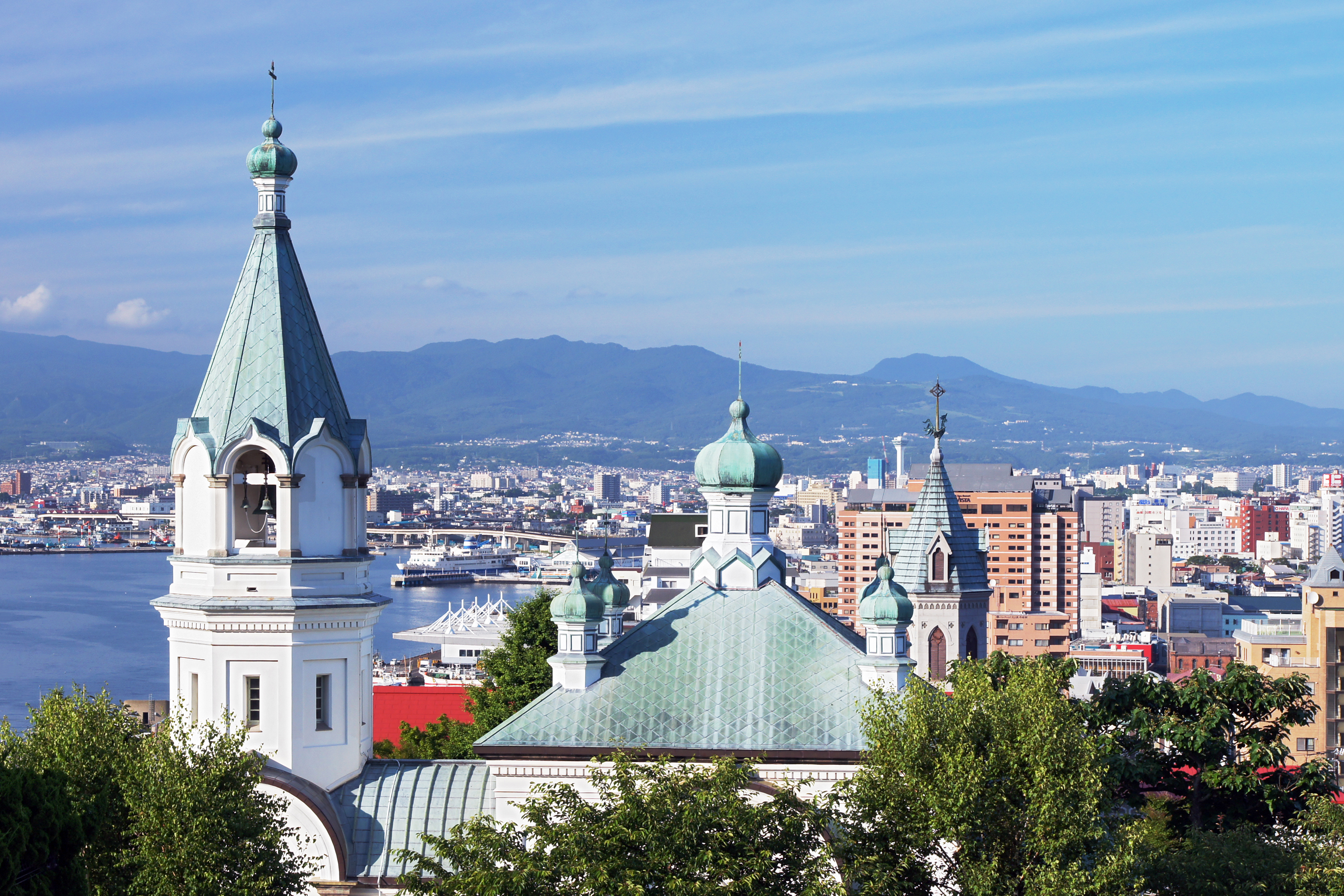
Hakodate

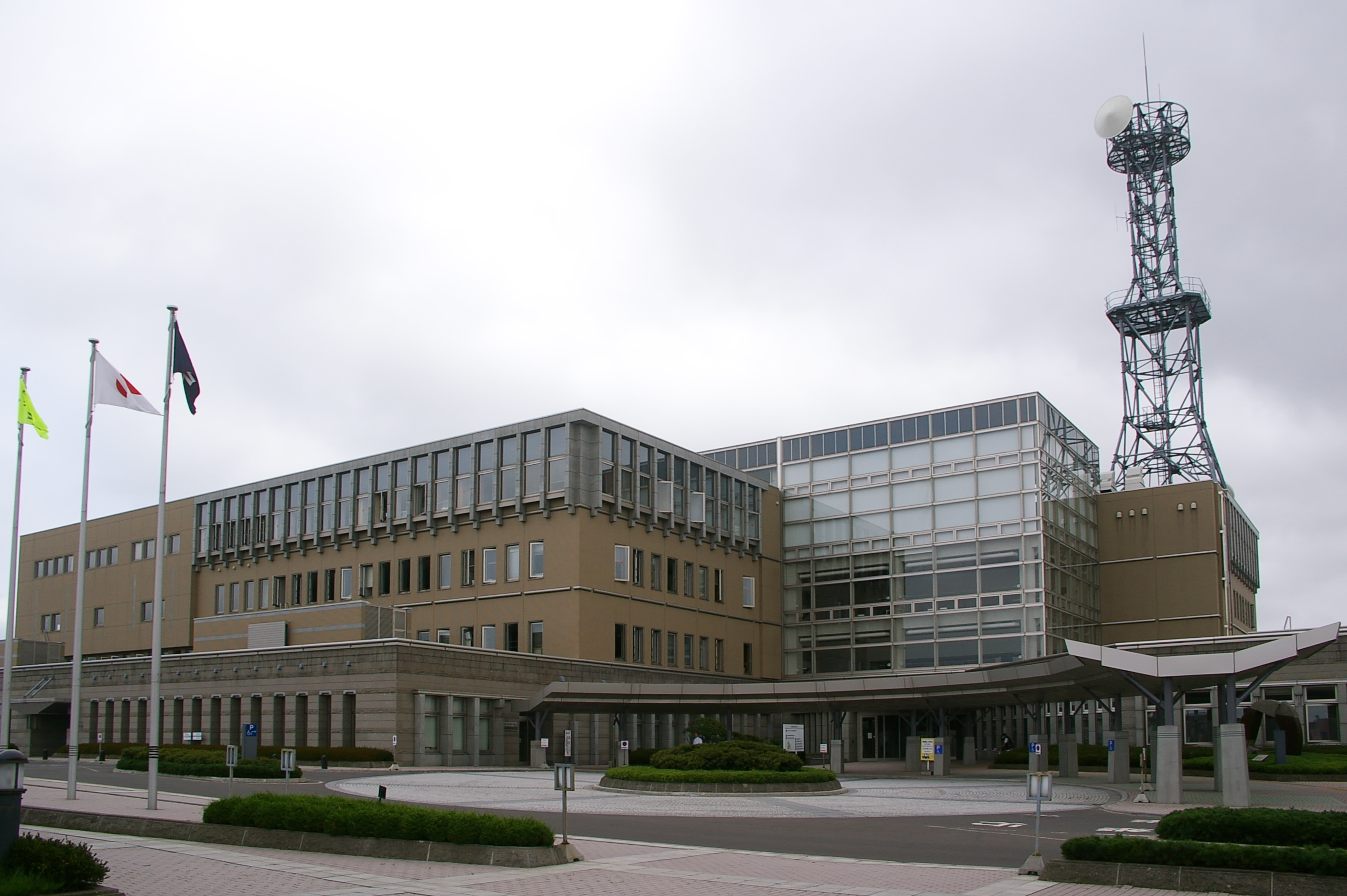
Hokkaido Government Oshima Subprefectural Office in Hakodate

Oshima (渡島総合振興局, Oshima-sōgō-shinkō-kyoku) is a subprefecture of Hokkaido Prefecture, Japan. As of 2004, it had a population of 456,621 and an area of 3,715.38 km^{2}.

Hakodate Airport is located in the City of Hakodate.

== Geography ==
The subprefecture is located on the Oshima Peninsula.

=== Municipalities ===
Name		Area (km^{2})	Population	District	Type	Map
Rōmaji	Kanji	Area (km^{2})	Population	District	Type	Map
Fukushima	福島町	187.23	4,390	Matsumae District	Town	
Hakodate (capital)	函館市	677.89	264,845	no district	City	
Hokuto	北斗市	397.29	46,083	no district	City	
Kikonai	木古内町	221.88	4,448	Kamiiso District	Town	
Matsumae	松前町	293.11	7,843	Matsumae District	Town	
Mori	森町	378.27	16,299	Kayabe District	Town	
Nanae	七飯町	216.61	28,514	Kameda District	Town	
Oshamambe	長万部町	310.75	5,694	Yamakoshi District	Town	
Shikabe	鹿部町	110.61	3,920	Kayabe District	Town	
Shiriuchi	知内町	196.67	4,620	Kamiiso District	Town	
Yakumo	八雲町	955.98	17,299	Futami District	Town	

== History ==
- 1897: Hakodate Subprefecture, Kameda Subprefecture, and Matsumae Subprefecture was established.
- 1899: Hakodate Subprefecture was abolished. Kameda Subprefecture was transferred to Hakodate and renamed Hakodate Subprefecture.
- 1903: Matsumae Subprefecture was merged into Hakodate Subprefecture.
- 1922: Hakodate Subprefecture changed its name to Oshima Subprefecture.
