= Kayabe District, Hokkaido =

District in Hokkaido, Japan

Coordinates: 42.069°N 140.622°E

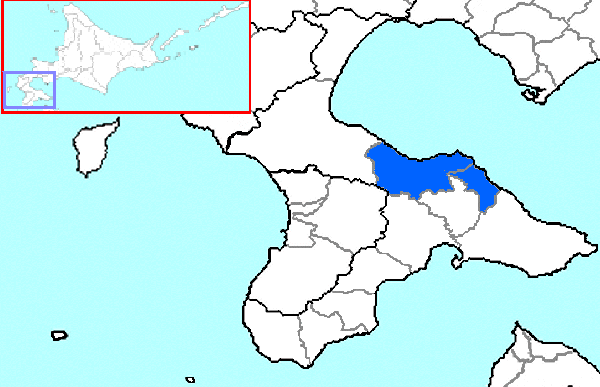
The area of Kayabe District in Oshima Subprefecture.

Kayabe (茅部郡, Kayabe-gun) is a district located in Oshima Subprefecture, Hokkaido, Japan.

As of 2004, the district has an estimated population of 24,463 and a density of 51.09 persons per km^{2}. The total area is 478.82 km^{2}.

== Towns ==
- Mori
- Shikabe

== Mergers ==
- On December 1, 2004, the town of Minamikayabe was merged into the expanded city of Hakodate.
- On April 1, 2005, the town of Sawara merged into the town of Mori.
