= Bentenyama Tunnel =

Railway tunnel in Honshu, Japan

Bentenyama Railway Tunnel
- Interactive map of Bentenyama Railway Tunnel

Overview
- Line: Tokaido Shinkansen
- Location: between Shin-yokohama Station and Odawara Station
- Coordinates: 35°17′38″N 139°12′46″E
- Status: active

Operation
- Opened: 1962
- Operator: Central Japan Railway Company
- Traffic: Railway
- Character: Passenger and Freight

Technical
- Line length: 1.316 km (0.818 mi)
- No. of tracks: 2

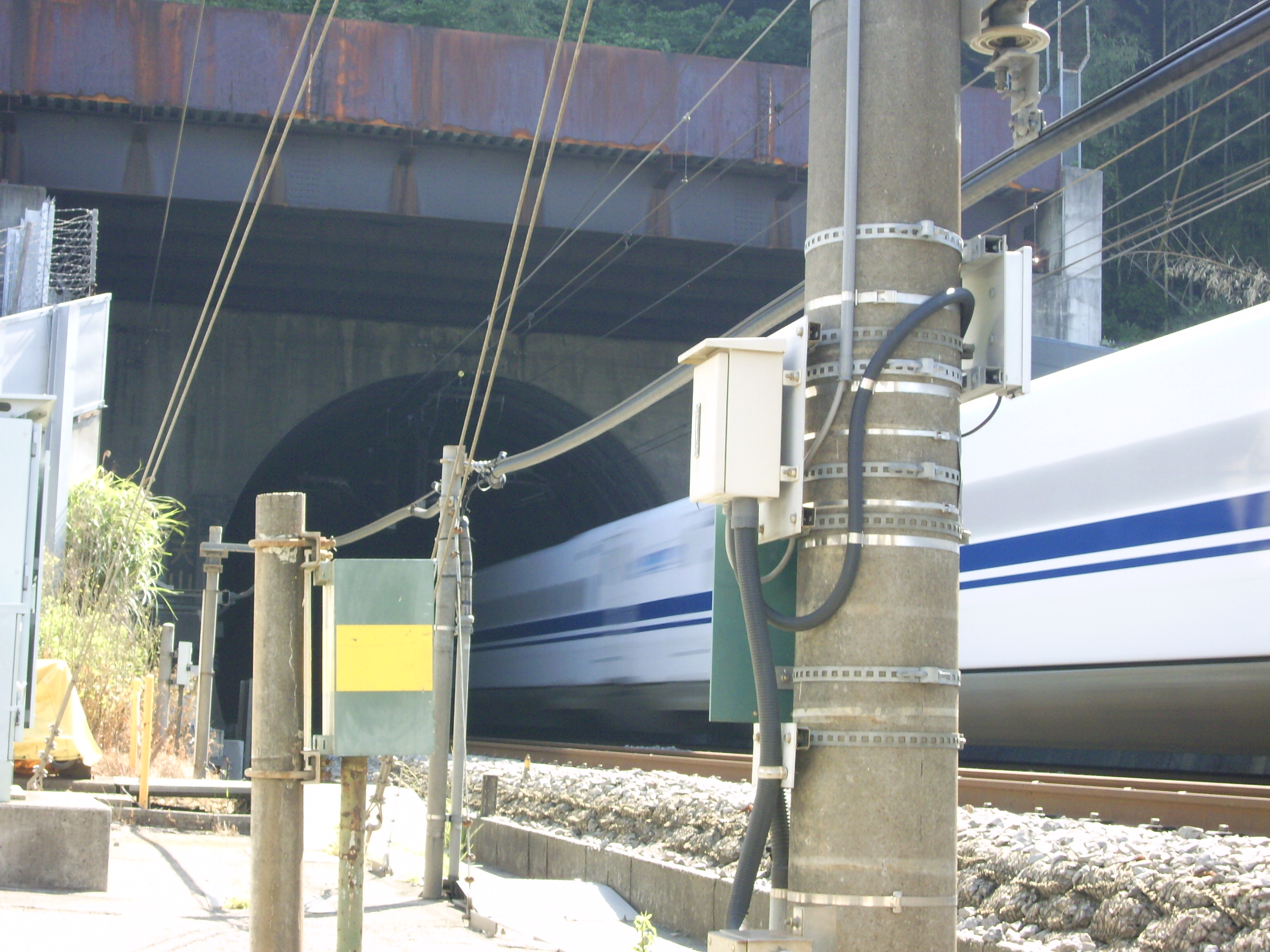
Bentenyama Tunnel.

Bentenyama Tunnel (弁天山トンネル, Bentenyama tonneru) is a tunnel on Tokaido Shinkansen operated by Central Japan Railway Company located between Shin-yokohama Station and Odawara Station with total length of 1.316 km. It was built and completed in 1962. The Benten-yama tunnel, spanning approximately 1.3 kilometers, sits close to Kozu area in the southwestern region of Oiso hill land (Kanagawa Prefecture), predominantly characterized by diluvium-tertiary formations of soil. Alongside the tunnel's path, the hill is primarily composed of alternating layers of sand gravel beds and tuffaceous mudstone beds.

== See also ==
- List of tunnels in Japan
- Seikan Tunnel undersea tunnel between Honshu-Hokkaido islands
- Kanmon Railway Tunnel undersea tunnel between Honshu-Kyushu islands
- Sakhalin–Hokkaido Tunnel proposed undersea tunnel between Rusia and Japan
- Bohai Strait tunnel proposed undersea tunnel in Yellow Sea, China
