= Nabetachiyama Tunnel =

Railway tunnel in Honshu, Japan

Nabetachiyama Railway Tunnel
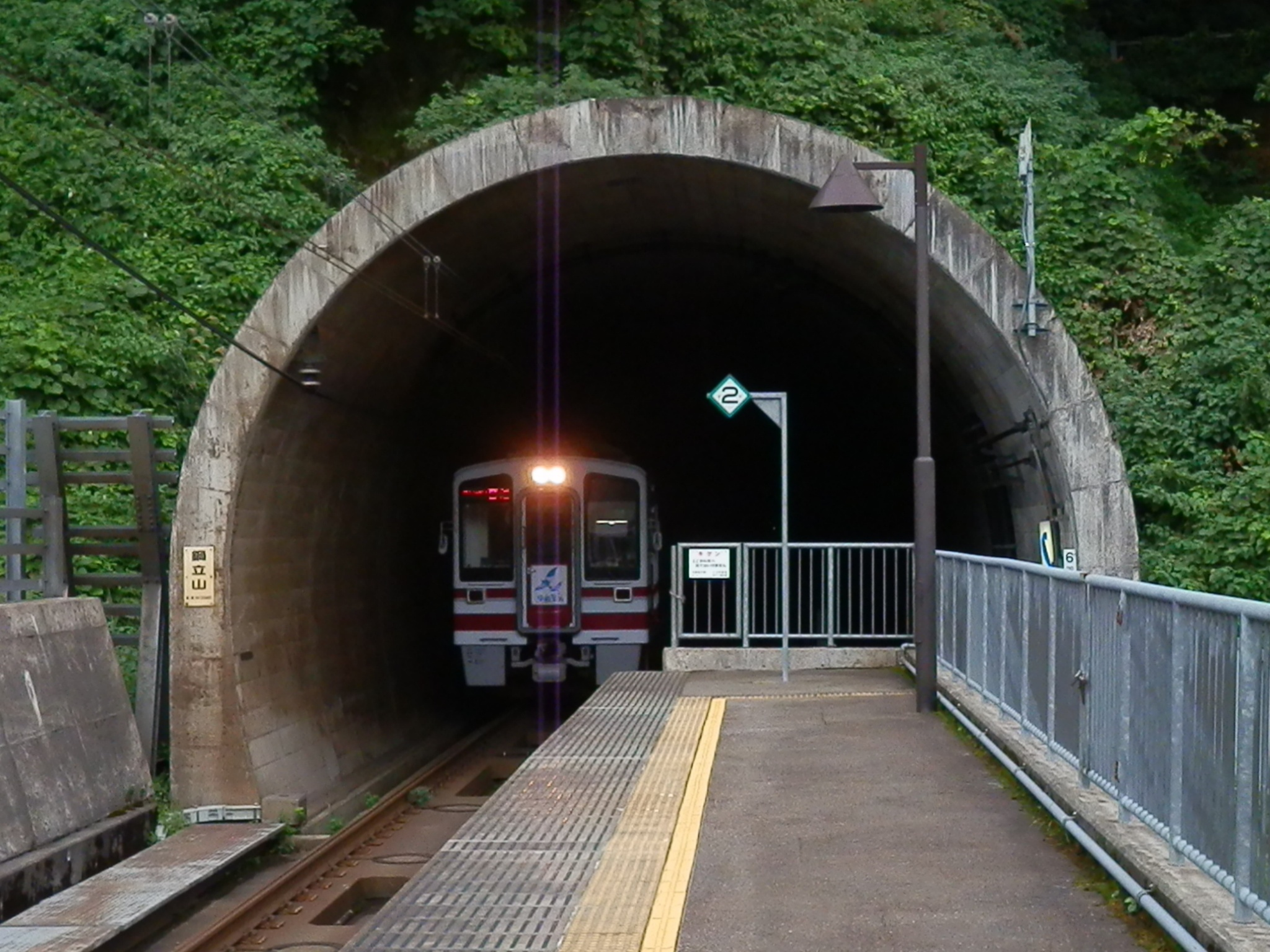
- Nabetateyama tunnel on Hokuhoku Line
- Interactive map of Nabetachiyama Railway Tunnel

Overview
- Line: Hokuhoku Line
- Location: between Matsudai Station and Hokuhoku-Ōshima Station
- Coordinates: 37°8′12.645″N 138°34′2.103″E
- Status: active

Operation
- Opened: 1997
- Operator: Hokuetsu Express Railway
- Traffic: Railway
- Character: Passenger and Freight

Technical
- Line length: 9,130 m (29,950 ft)
- No. of tracks: 2
- Track gauge: 1,067 mm (3 ft 6 in)

Nabetachiyama Tunnel (鍋立山トンネル, Nabetachiyama tonneru) is a tunnel on Hokuhoku Line under Mount Nabetachiyama that runs from Oshima Ward, Joetsu city, Niigata prefecture to Matsushiro, Tokamachi city, Niigata prefecture with total length of 9.130 km. It was built and completed in 1997.

== See also ==
- List of tunnels in Japan
- Seikan Tunnel
- Sakhalin–Hokkaido Tunnel
- Bohai Strait tunnel
