= Tsukiyono Tunnel =

Railway tunnel in Honshu, Japan

Tsukiyono Railway Tunnel
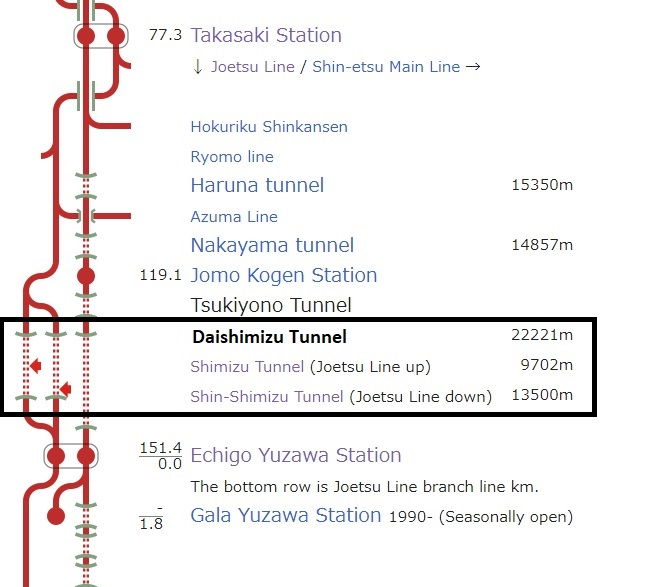
- Tsukiyono tunnel under Mount Tanigawa next to Daishimizu Tunnel
- Interactive map of Tsukiyono Railway Tunnel

Overview
- Line: Joetsu Shinkansen
- Location: between Jōmō-Kōgen Station–Echigo-Yuzawa Station
- Coordinates: 36°45′21.7296″N 138°57′54.2982″E
- Status: active

Operation
- Opened: 1982
- Operator: East Japan Railway Company
- Traffic: Railway
- Character: Passenger and freight

Technical
- Line length: 7,295 m (23,934 ft)
- No. of tracks: 2

Tsukiyono Tunnel (月夜野トンネル, Tsukiyono tonneru) is a tunnel on JR's Joetsu Shinkansen located next to Daishimizu Tunnel or between Jōmō-Kōgen Station and Echigo-Yuzawa Station in Niigata Prefecture with total length of 7.295 km. It was built and completed in 1982.

== See also ==
- List of tunnels in Japan
- Seikan Tunnel undersea tunnel between Honshu-Hokkaido islands
- Kanmon Railway Tunnel undersea tunnel between Honshu-Kyushu islands
- Sakhalin–Hokkaido Tunnel
- Bohai Strait tunnel
