= Yui Tunnel =

Railway tunnel in Honshu, Japan

Yui Railway Tunnel
- Interactive map of Yui Railway Tunnel

Overview
- Line: Tokaido Shinkansen
- Location: between Shin-Fuji Station and Shizuoka Station
- Coordinates: 35°4′50″N 138°31′46″E
- Status: active

Operation
- Opened: 1968
- Operator: Central Japan Railway Company
- Traffic: Railway
- Character: Passenger and Freight

Technical
- Line length: 3.993 km (2.481 mi)
- No. of tracks: 2

Yui Tunnel (由比トンネル, Yui tonneru) is a railway tunnel on Tokaido Shinkansen operated by Central Japan Railway Company located between Shin-Fuji Station and Shizuoka Station with total length of 3.993 km. It was built and completed in 1968.

== See also ==
- List of tunnels in Japan
