= Shin-Karikachi Tunnel =

Railway tunnel in Honshu, Japan

Shin-Karikachi Railway Tunnel
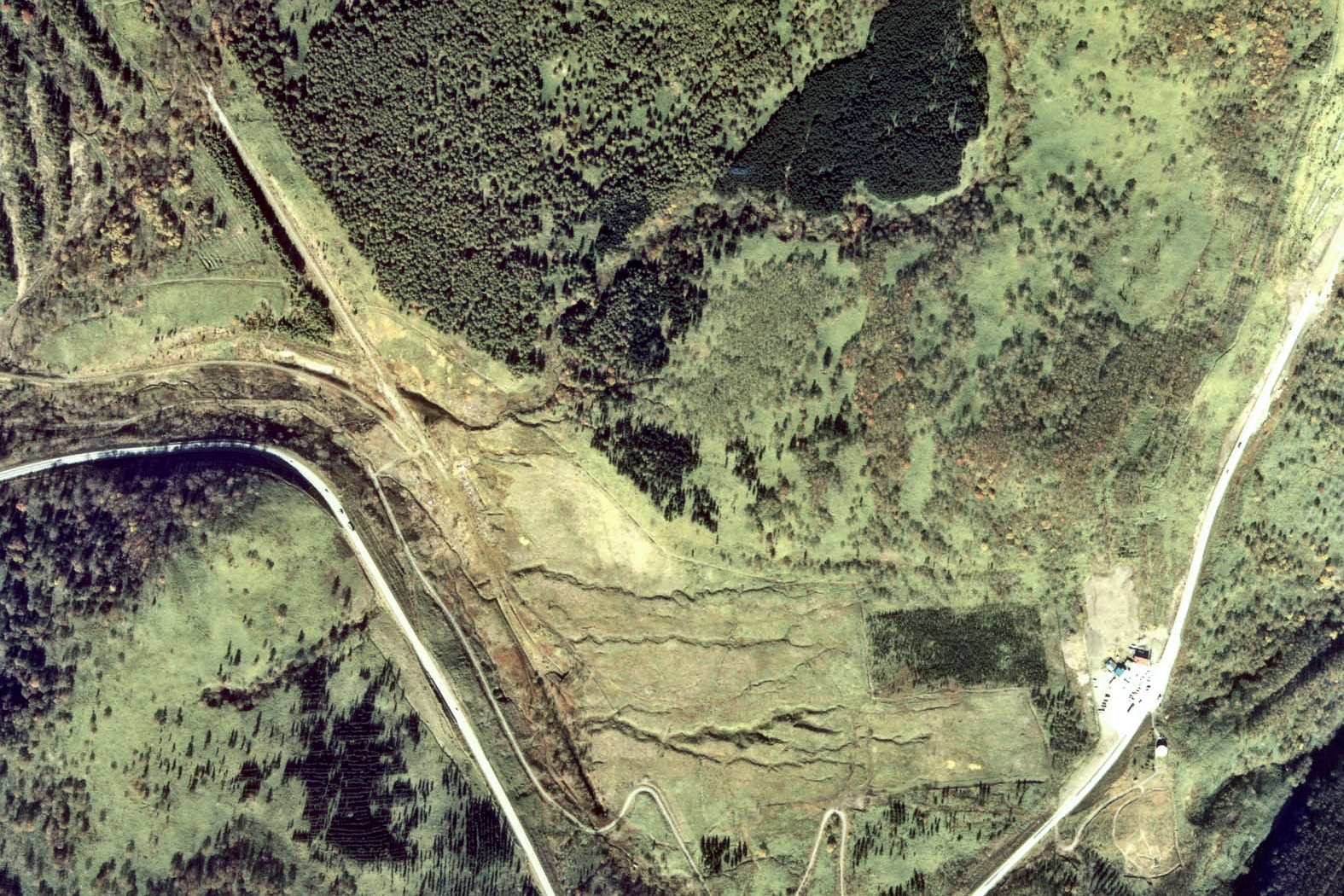
- Old Karikachi Tunnel entrance's location (bottom right)
- Interactive map of Shin-Karikachi Railway Tunnel

Overview
- Line: Nemuro Main Line
- Location: between Ochiai Station (Hokkaido) and Shintoku Station
- Coordinates: 43°3′20.4588″N 142°48′0.4536″E
- Status: active

Operation
- Opened: 1966
- Operator: Japanese National Railways
- Traffic: Railway
- Character: Passenger and Freight

Technical
- Line length: 5,790 m (19,000 ft)
- No. of tracks: 2

Shin-Karikachi Tunnel (新狩勝トンネル, Shin-Karikachi tonneru) is a tunnel on JR Hokkaido's Nemuro Main Line that runs between Ochiai Station and Shintoku Station in Tokachi District, Hokkaido with total length of 5.790 km. It was built and completed in 1966.

== See also ==
- List of tunnels in Japan
- Seikan Tunnel undersea tunnel between Honshu-Hokkaido islands
- Kanmon Railway Tunnel undersea tunnel between Honshu-Kyushu islands
- Sakhalin–Hokkaido Tunnel
- Bohai Strait tunnel
