= Ikuta Tunnel =

Railway tunnel in Honshu, Japan

Ikuta Railway Tunnel
- Map of JR East Musashino Line
- Interactive map of Ikuta Railway Tunnel

Overview
- Line: Musashino Line
- Location: between Ikuta Station and Fuchūhommachi Station
- Coordinates: 35°36′56.7576″N 139°32′46.6542″E
- Status: active

Operation
- Opened: 1976
- Operator: East Japan Railway Company
- Traffic: Railway
- Character: Passenger and Freight

Technical
- Line length: 10,359 m (33,986 ft)
- No. of tracks: 2

Ikuta Tunnel (生田トンネル, Ikuta tonneru) is a tunnel on JR's Musashino Line that runs near Ikuta Station, Kawasaki in Kanagawa Prefecture with total length of 10.359 km. It was built and completed in 1976.

== See also ==
- List of tunnels in Japan
- Seikan Tunnel undersea tunnel between Honshu-Hokkaido islands
- Kanmon Railway Tunnel undersea tunnel between Honshu-Kyushu islands
- Sakhalin–Hokkaido Tunnel
- Bohai Strait tunnel
