= Nakayama Tunnel =

Railway tunnel in Japan

Nakayama Railway Tunnel
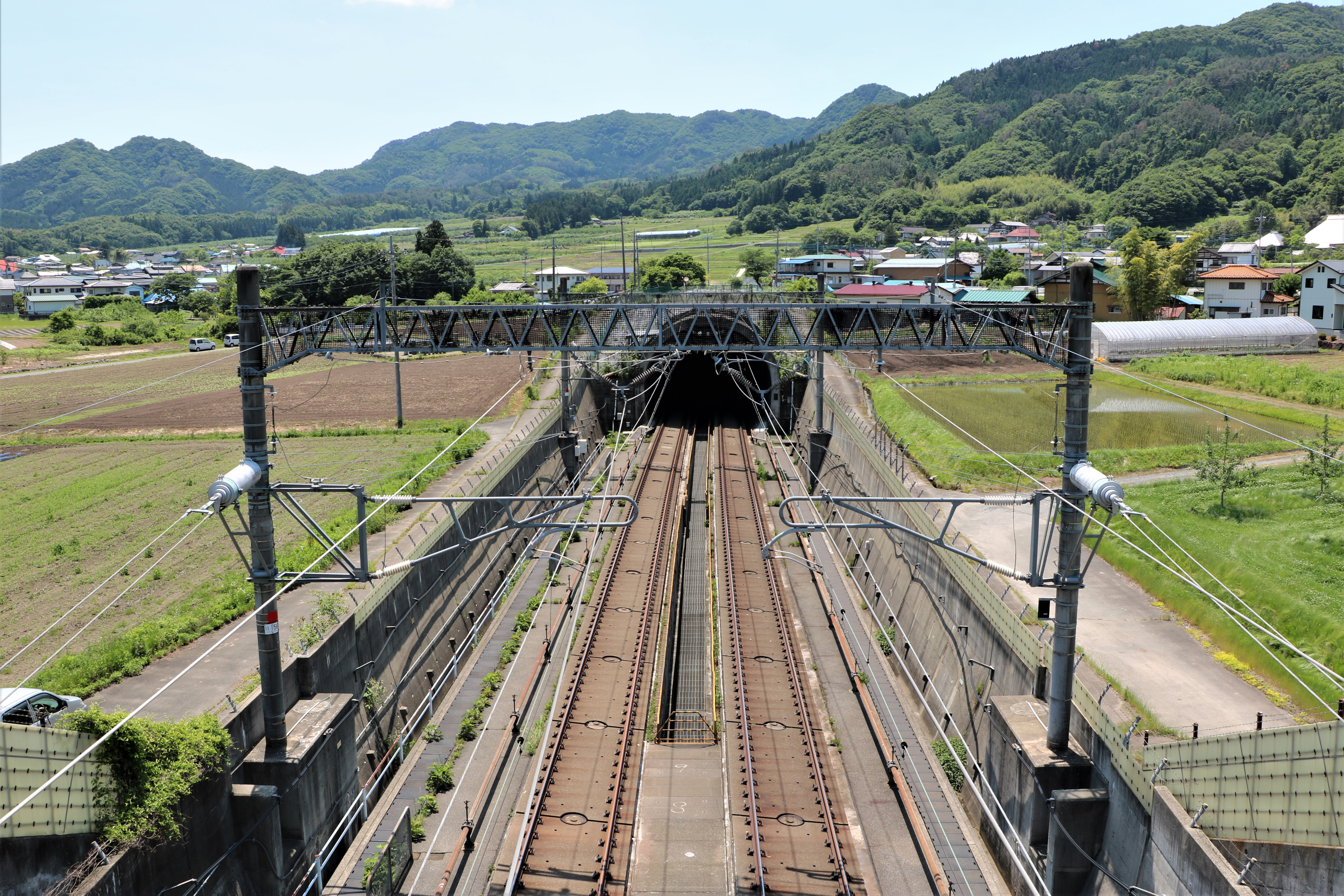
- North side of Nakayama Tunnel on Joetsu Shinkansen line
- Interactive map of Nakayama Railway Tunnel

Overview
- Line: Joetsu Shinkansen
- Location: between Takasaki and Shibukawa, Gunma
- Coordinates: 36°28′32.9052″N 138°58′25.5858″E
- Status: active

Operation
- Opened: 1982
- Operator: East Japan Railway Company
- Traffic: Railway
- Character: Passenger and Freight

Technical
- Line length: 14.857 km (9.232 mi)
- No. of tracks: 2

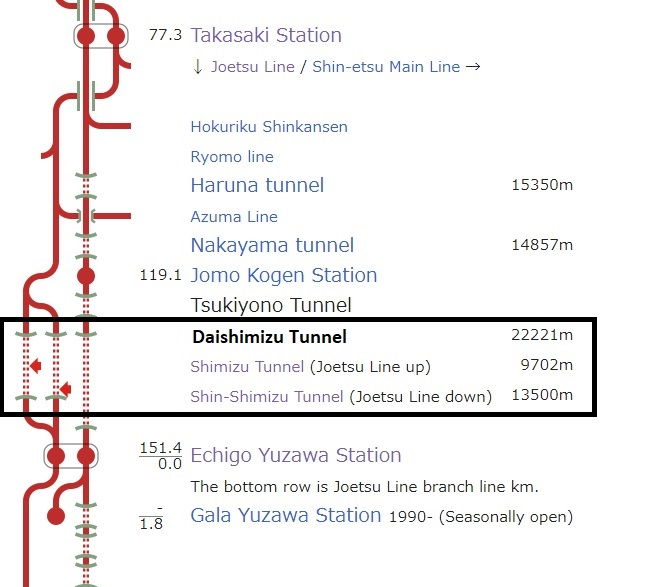
Nakayama Tunnel.

Nakayama Tunnel (中山トンネル, Nakayama tonneru) is a tunnel on JR East-Joetsu Shinkansen line in Japan that runs from Jomo Kogen, Takasaki city to Onoko, Shibukawa city, in Gunma prefecture with approximate length of 14.857 km. It was completed and opened in 1982.

== See also ==
- List of tunnels in Japan
- Seikan Tunnel Tappi Shakō Line
- Sakhalin–Hokkaido Tunnel
- Bohai Strait tunnel
