= Akima Tunnel =

Railway tunnel in Honshu, Japan

Akima Railway Tunnel
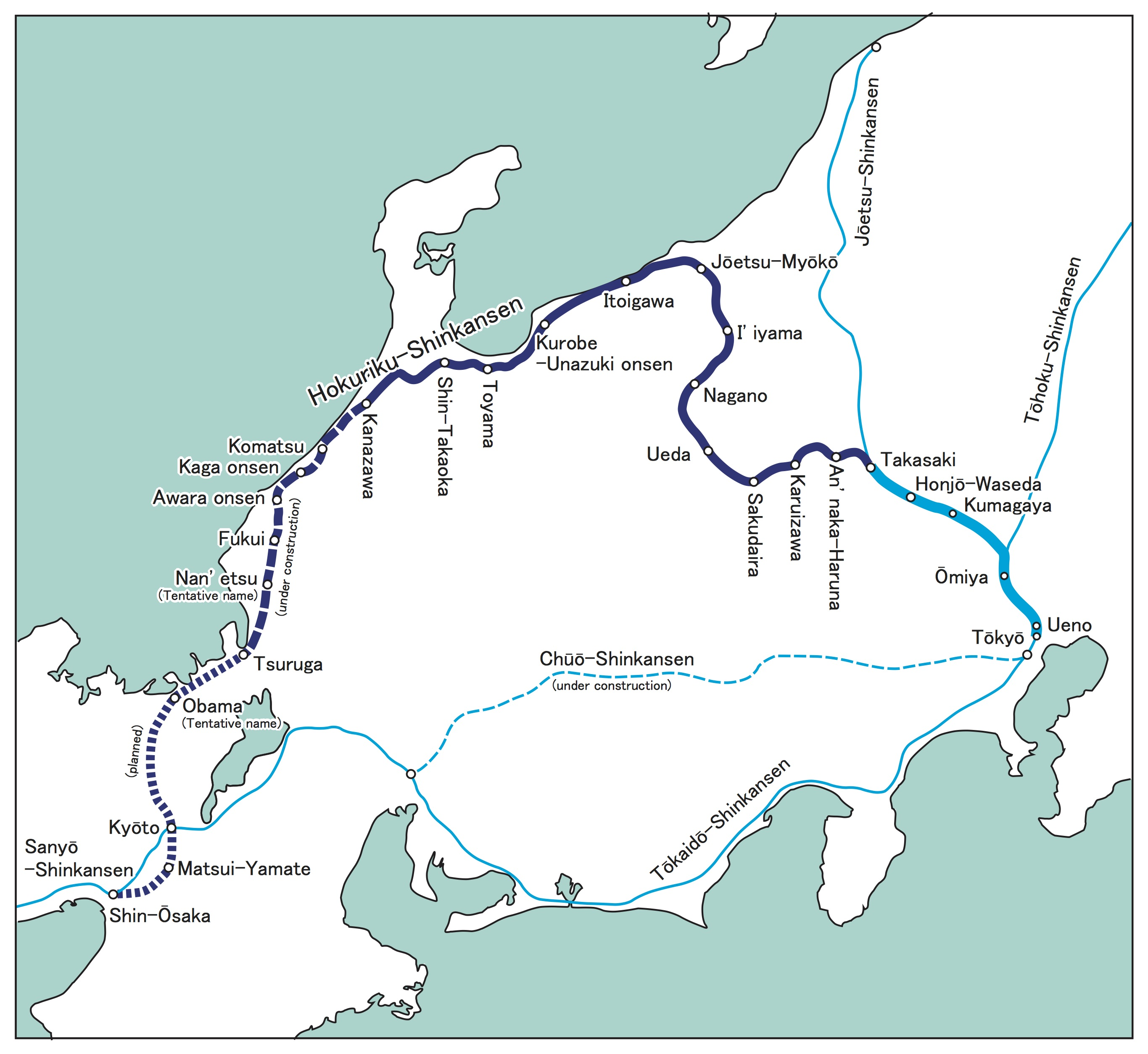
- Akima Tunnel on the Hokuriku Shinkansen
- Interactive map of Akima Railway Tunnel

Overview
- Line: Hokuriku Shinkansen
- Location: between Takasaki city and Karuizawa
- Coordinates: 36°23′13.1496″N 138°48′17.2866″E
- Status: active

Operation
- Opened: 1997
- Operator: East Japan Railway Company
- Traffic: Railway
- Character: Passenger and Freight

Technical
- Line length: 8,295 m (27,215 ft)
- No. of tracks: 2

Akima Tunnel (秋間トンネル, Akima tonneru) is a tunnel on JR's Hokuriku Shinkansen located between Takasaki city (Gunma Prefecture) and Karuizawa town in Nagano Prefecture with total length of 8.295 km. It was built and completed in 1997.

== See also ==
- List of tunnels in Japan
- Seikan Tunnel undersea tunnel between Honshu-Hokkaido islands
- Kanmon Railway Tunnel undersea tunnel between Honshu-Kyushu islands
- Sakhalin–Hokkaido Tunnel
- Bohai Strait tunnel
