= Otowayama Tunnel =

Railway tunnel in Japan

Otowayama Railway Tunnel
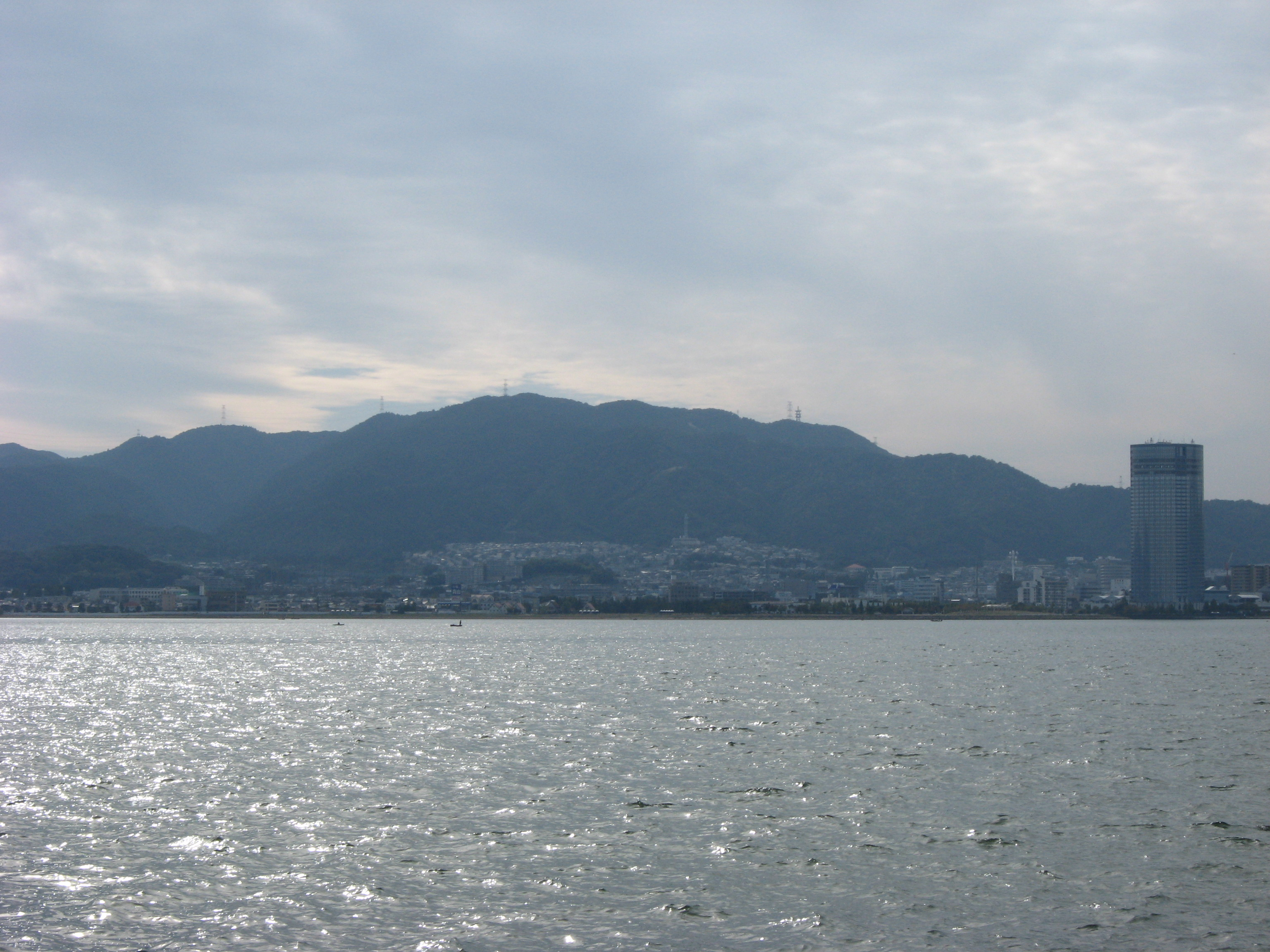
- Otowayama Tunnel located under Mt. Otowayama seen from Lake Biwa side
- Interactive map of Otowayama Railway Tunnel

Overview
- Line: Tokaido Shinkansen
- Location: between Kyoto–Otsu
- Coordinates: 34°58′36.7602″N 135°51′24.624″E
- Status: active

Operation
- Opened: 1964
- Operator: Central Japan Railway Company
- Traffic: Railway
- Character: Passenger and freight

Technical
- Line length: 5,045 m (16,552 ft)
- No. of tracks: 2

Otowayama Tunnel (音羽山トンネル, Otowayama tonneru) is a tunnel on JR's Tokaido Shinkansen located between Kyoto city and Otsu City, Shiga Prefecture with total length of 5.045 km. It was built and completed in 1964.

== See also ==
- List of tunnels in Japan
- Seikan Tunnel undersea tunnel between Honshu-Hokkaido islands
- Kanmon Railway Tunnel undersea tunnel between Honshu-Kyushu islands
- Sakhalin–Hokkaido Tunnel
- Bohai Strait tunnel
