= Nihonzaka Tunnel =

Railway tunnel in Honshu, Japan

Nihonzaka Railway Tunnel
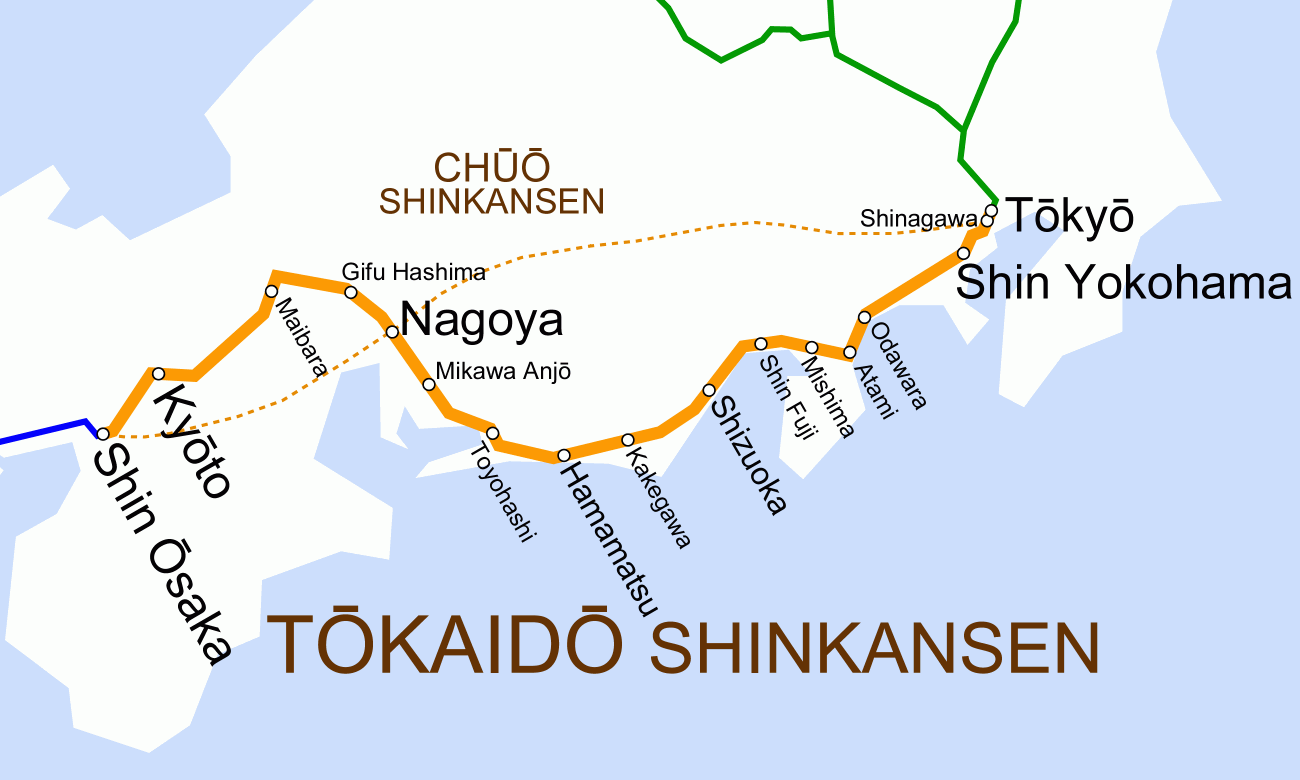
- Map of Tokaidō Shinkansen line.
- Interactive map of Nihonzaka Railway Tunnel

Overview
- Line: Tōkaidō Shinkansen
- Location: between Shizuoka Station and Kakegawa Station
- Coordinates: 34°54′15.9948″N 138°20′37.4778″E
- Status: active

Operation
- Opened: 1964
- Operator: Central Japan Railway Company
- Traffic: Railway
- Character: Passenger and Freight

Technical
- Line length: 2,174 m (7,133 ft)
- No. of tracks: 2

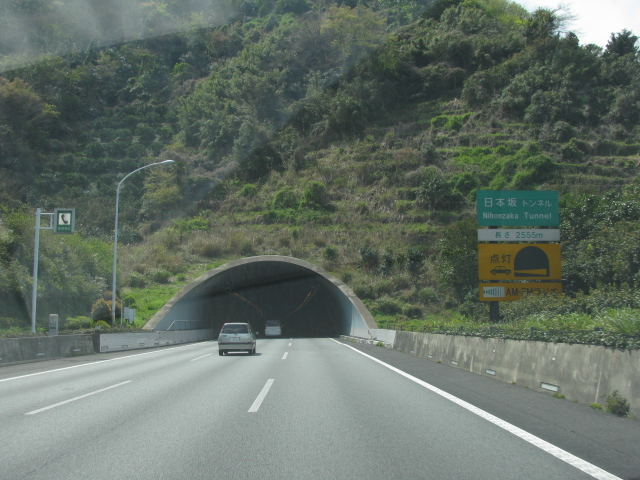
日本坂トンネル / Expressway Nihonzaka Tunnel

Nihonzaka Tunnel (日本坂トンネル, Nihonzaka tonneru) is a tunnel on Tōkaidō Shinkansen that runs from Shizuoka Station and Kakegawa Station in Shizuoka city, Shizuoka Prefecture with total length of 2.174 km. It was built and completed in 1964.

== See also ==
- List of tunnels in Japan
- Seikan Tunnel undersea tunnel between Honshu-Hokkaido islands
- Kanmon Railway Tunnel undersea tunnel between Honshu-Kyushu islands
- Sakhalin–Hokkaido Tunnel
- Bohai Strait tunnel
