= Kanbara Tunnel =

Railway tunnel in Honshu, Japan

Kanbara Railway Tunnel
- Interactive map of Kanbara Railway Tunnel

Overview
- Line: Tokaido Shinkansen
- Location: between Shin-Fuji Station and Shizuoka Station
- Coordinates: 35°7′43″N 138°35′45″E
- Status: active

Operation
- Opened: 1964
- Operator: Central Japan Railway Company
- Traffic: Railway
- Character: Passenger and Freight

Technical
- Line length: 4.934 km (3.066 mi)
- No. of tracks: 2

Cross-sectional comparison map of Expressway and Tokaido Shinkansen including one in the Kanbara Tunnel.

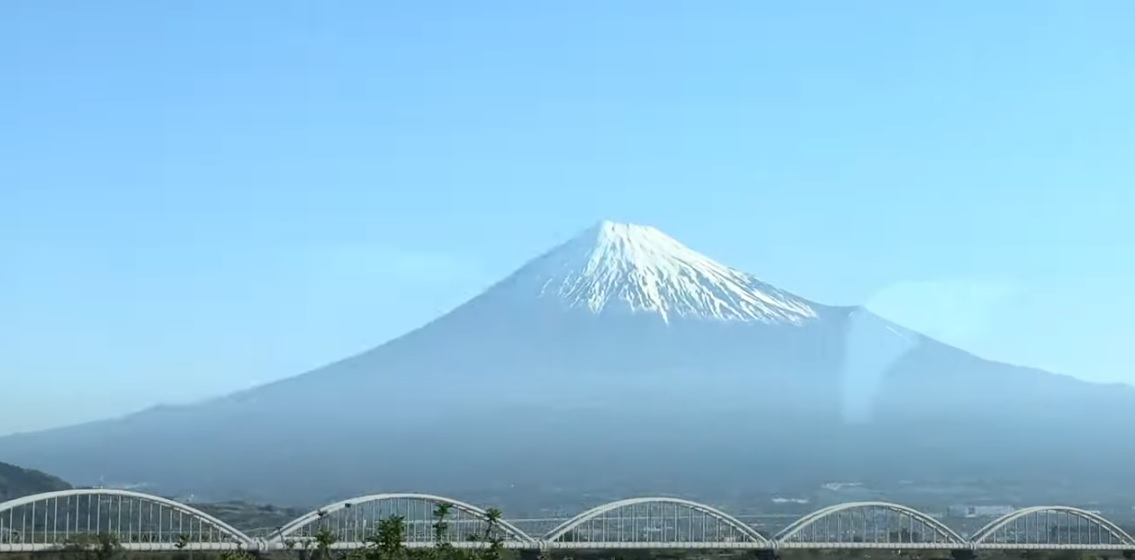
Mount Fuji seen from Tokaido shinkansen along Fuji river before the Kanbara tunnel (and after Shin-Fuji station from Tokyo westward toward Osaka).

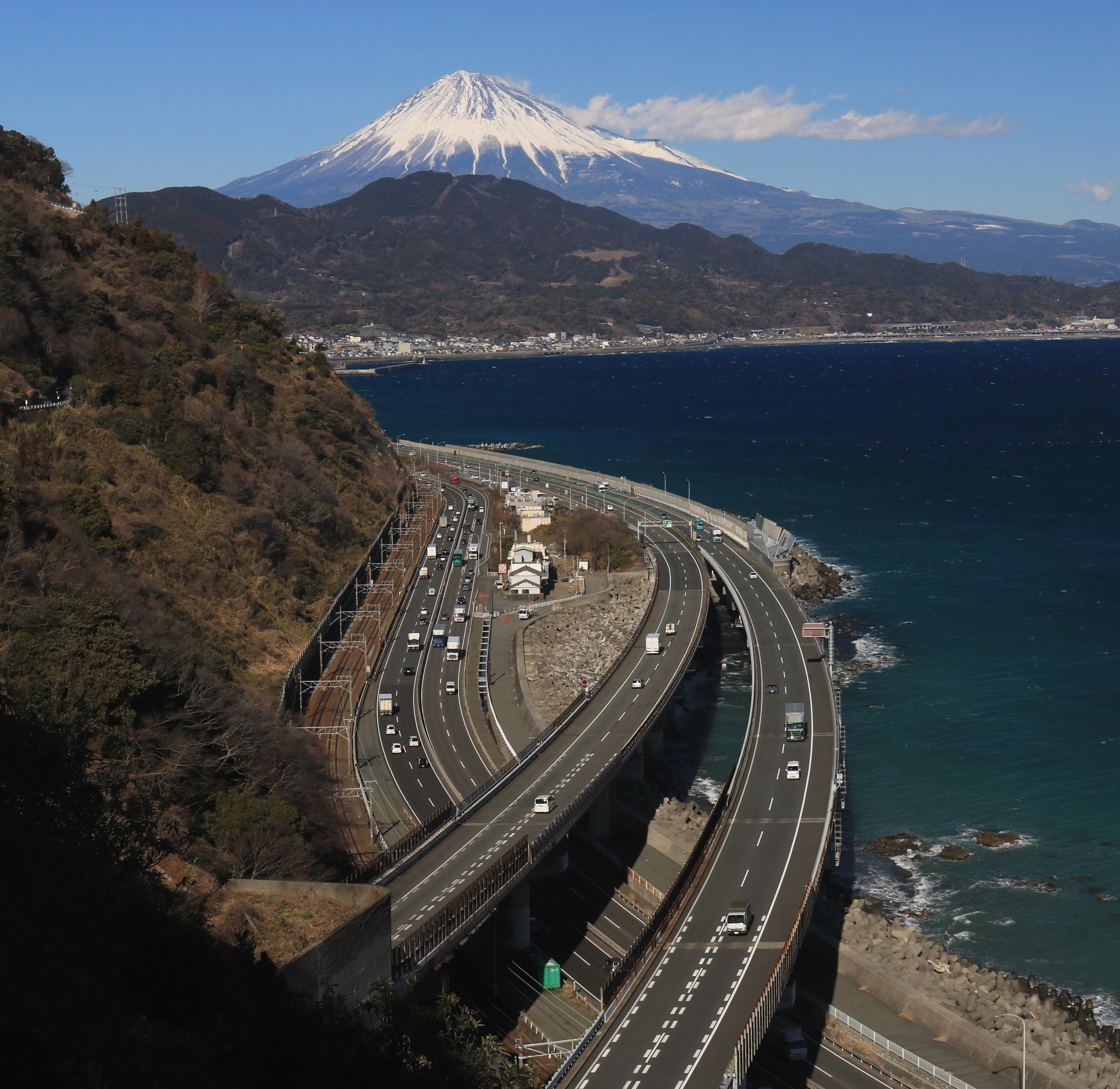
Typical view of Mount Fuji from a location near the tunnel.

Kanbara Tunnel (蒲原トンネル, Kanbara tonneru) is a tunnel on Tokaido Shinkansen operated by Central Japan Railway Company located between Shin-Fuji Station and Shizuoka Station with total length of 4.934 km. It was built and completed in 1964. It is located after Shin-Fuji station and crossing the Fuji River, westward from Tokyo towards Osaka direction. The 0.294 kPa air pressures within the train cars inside Kanbara tunnel were managed according to the initial plan, preventing any auditory discomfort. It illustrates that the computer simulation outcomes align closely with the experimental data.

Due to the age of the tunnel and the frequent occurrence of earthquakes in Japan, regular renovation & maintenance by 2000 workers in 2015 was carried out at night after the last train has passed, especially on "large-scale renovation works" to prevent cracks from appearing due to vibrations caused when the Shinkansen train runs and to ensure that the shinkansen line is parts of "the safest transportation systems in the world". The last time maintenance was performed on the electrical equipment along the Kanbara Tunnel of the major Tokyo-Osaka Shinkansen line was in January 2023 by Central Nippon Expressway Co., Ltd. (NEXCO).

== See also ==
- List of tunnels in Japan
- Seikan Tunnel undersea tunnel between Honshu-Hokkaido islands
- Kanmon Railway Tunnel undersea tunnel between Honshu-Kyushu islands
- Sakhalin–Hokkaido Tunnel proposed undersea tunnel between Rusia and Japan
- Bohai Strait tunnel proposed undersea tunnel in Yellow Sea, China
