= Kobe Tunnel =

Railway tunnel in Honshu, Japan

Kobe Railway Tunnel
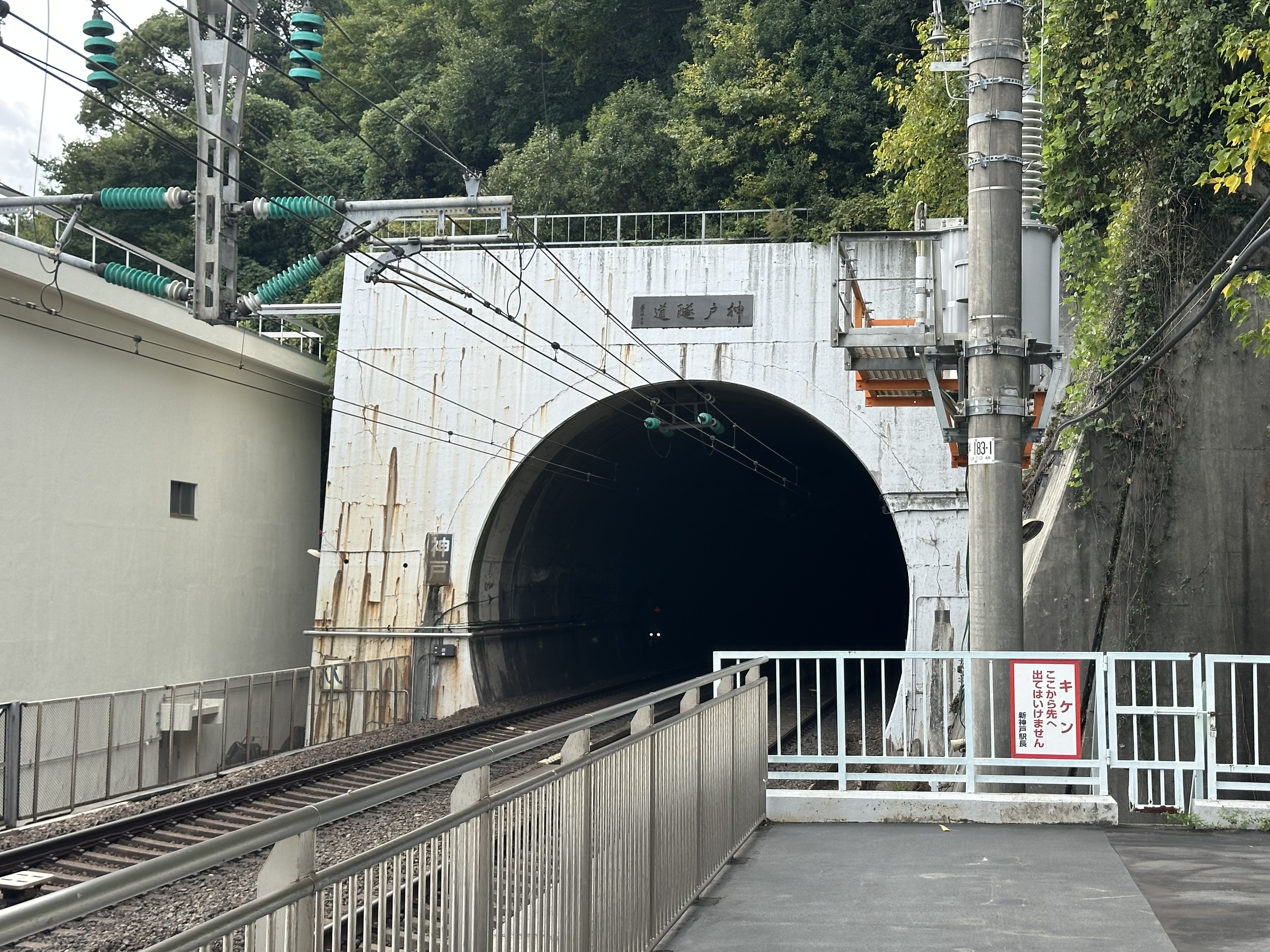
- Kobe Tunnel on Sanyo Shinkansen line
- Interactive map of Kobe Railway Tunnel

Overview
- Line: Sanyo Shinkansen
- Location: Shin-Kobe Station –Nishi-Akashi Station, Hyogo Prefecture
- Coordinates: 34°41′57.2136″N 135°9′34.6998″E
- Status: active

Operation
- Opened: 1972
- Operator: West Japan Railway Company
- Traffic: Railway
- Character: Passenger and freight

Technical
- Line length: 7,970 m (26,150 ft)
- No. of tracks: 2

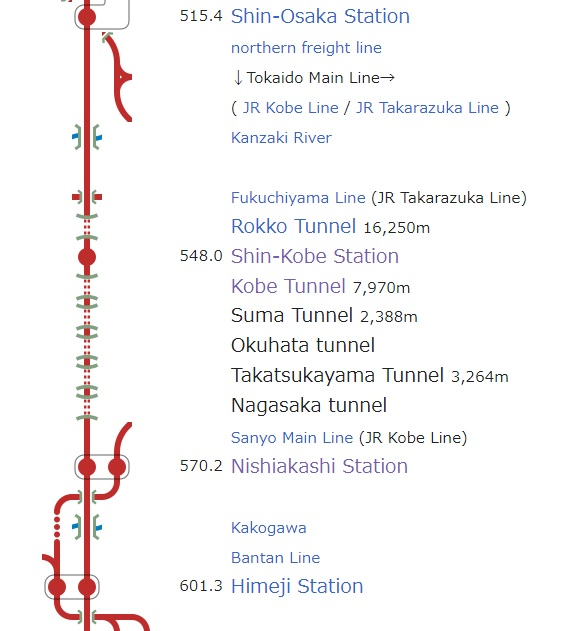
Kobe Tunnel on Sanyo Shinkansen line

Kobe Tunnel (神戸トンネル, Kobe tonneru) is a railway tunnel on JR's Sanyo Shinkansen line located between Shin-Kobe Station and Nishi-Akashi Station in Kobe City, Hyogo Prefecture next to Rokko Tunnel with total length of 7.970km. It was built and completed in 1972.

== See also ==
- List of tunnels in Japan
- Seikan Tunnel undersea tunnel between Honshu-Hokkaido islands
- Kanmon Railway Tunnel undersea tunnel between Honshu-Kyushu islands
- Sakhalin–Hokkaido Tunnel proposed undersea tunnel between Rusia and Japan
- Bohai Strait tunnel proposed undersea tunnel in Yellow Sea, China
