= Shin-Noborikawa Tunnel =

Railway tunnel in Hokkaido, Japan

Shin-Noborikawa Railway Tunnel
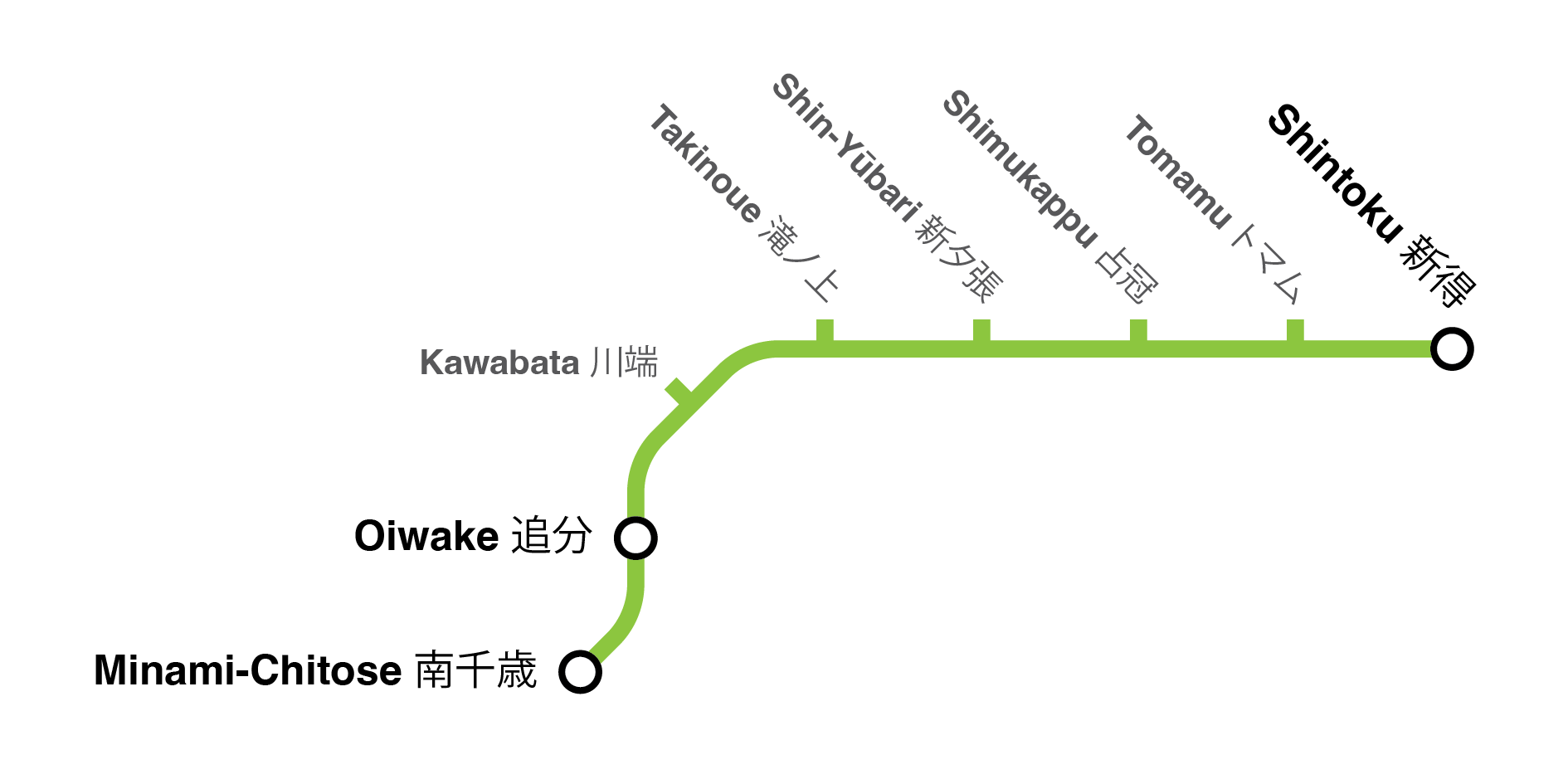
- Shin-Noborikawa Tunnel located between Shin-Yūbari Station and Shimukappu Station on Sekishō Line
- Interactive map of Shin-Noborikawa Railway Tunnel

Overview
- Line: Sekishō Line
- Location: between Shin-Yūbari Station and Shimukappu Station
- Coordinates: 42°56′46.9536″N 142°16′20.8704″E
- Status: active

Operation
- Opened: 1981
- Operator: Hokkaido Railway Company
- Traffic: Railway
- Character: Passenger and Freight

Technical
- Line length: 5,825 m (19,111 ft)
- No. of tracks: 2

Shin-Noborikawa Tunnel (新登川トンネル, Shin-Noborikawa tonneru) is a tunnel on JR Hokkaido's Sekishō Line that runs between Shin-Yūbari Station, Yufutsu District and Shimukappu Station in Shimukappu, Hokkaido with total length of 5.825 km. It was built and completed in 1981.

== See also ==
- List of tunnels in Japan
- Seikan Tunnel undersea tunnel between Honshu-Hokkaido islands
- Kanmon Railway Tunnel undersea tunnel between Honshu-Kyushu islands
- Sakhalin–Hokkaido Tunnel
- Bohai Strait tunnel
