= Haruna Tunnel =

Railway tunnel in Honshu, Japan

Haruna Railway Tunnel
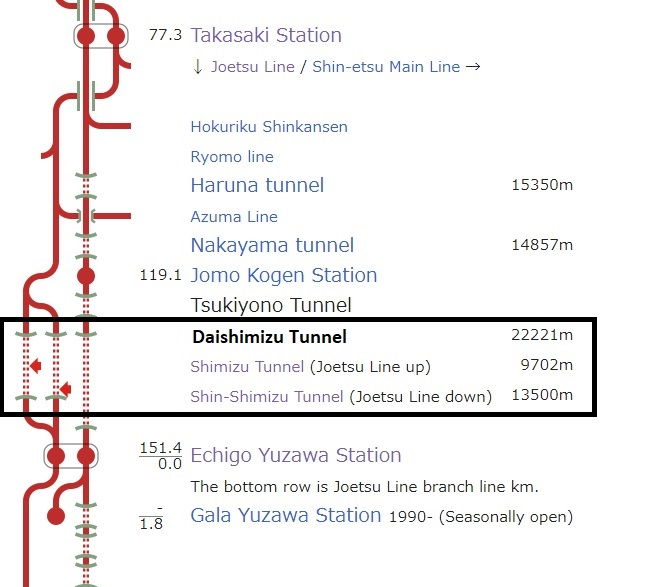
- Haruna Tunnel on Joetsu Shinkansen
- Interactive map of Haruna Railway Tunnel

Overview
- Line: Joetsu Shinkansen
- Location: Takasaki – Shibukawa
- Coordinates: 36°31′7.9422″N 138°58′16.446″E

Operation
- Opened: 1981
- Operator: JR East
- Character: Passenger and freight

Technical
- Line length: 15,350 m (50,360 ft)

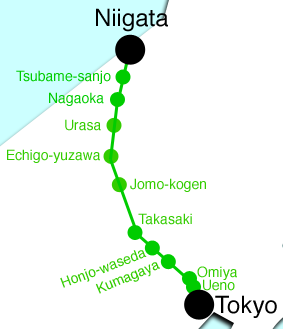
Map of Jōetsu Shinkansen line.

Haruna Tunnel (榛名(はるな)トンネル) is a tunnel on JR East-Joetsu Shinkansen line in Japan that runs from Nakazato-cho, Takasaki city to Kawashima, Shibukawa city, in Gunma prefecture with approximate length of 15.350 km. It was completed and opened in 1981.

Excavation was extremely difficult due to the poor geology consisting of volcanic mud flow sediments and water inflow reaching a maximum of 110 t/min, so injection, two-stage silot, and pressurization methods were used in combination. The discharge of tunnel water also affected the ground surface, causing a decrease and depletion of well water, irrigation water, and surface water. In addition, on July 20, 1978, a 30-meter-wide cave-in occurred in the Yamakoda area of Haibuto-Mura. The fields and the Arai-Shimomurota line of Gunma Prefectural Road No. 154 were engulfed, and a large amount of earth and sand flowed into the tunnel directly below (Shimo-Arai construction area).

== See also ==
- List of tunnels in Japan
- Seikan Tunnel Tappi Shakō Line
- Sakhalin–Hokkaido Tunnel
- Bohai Strait tunnel
