= Nasu Tunnel =

Railway tunnel in Honshu, Japan

Nasu Railway Tunnel
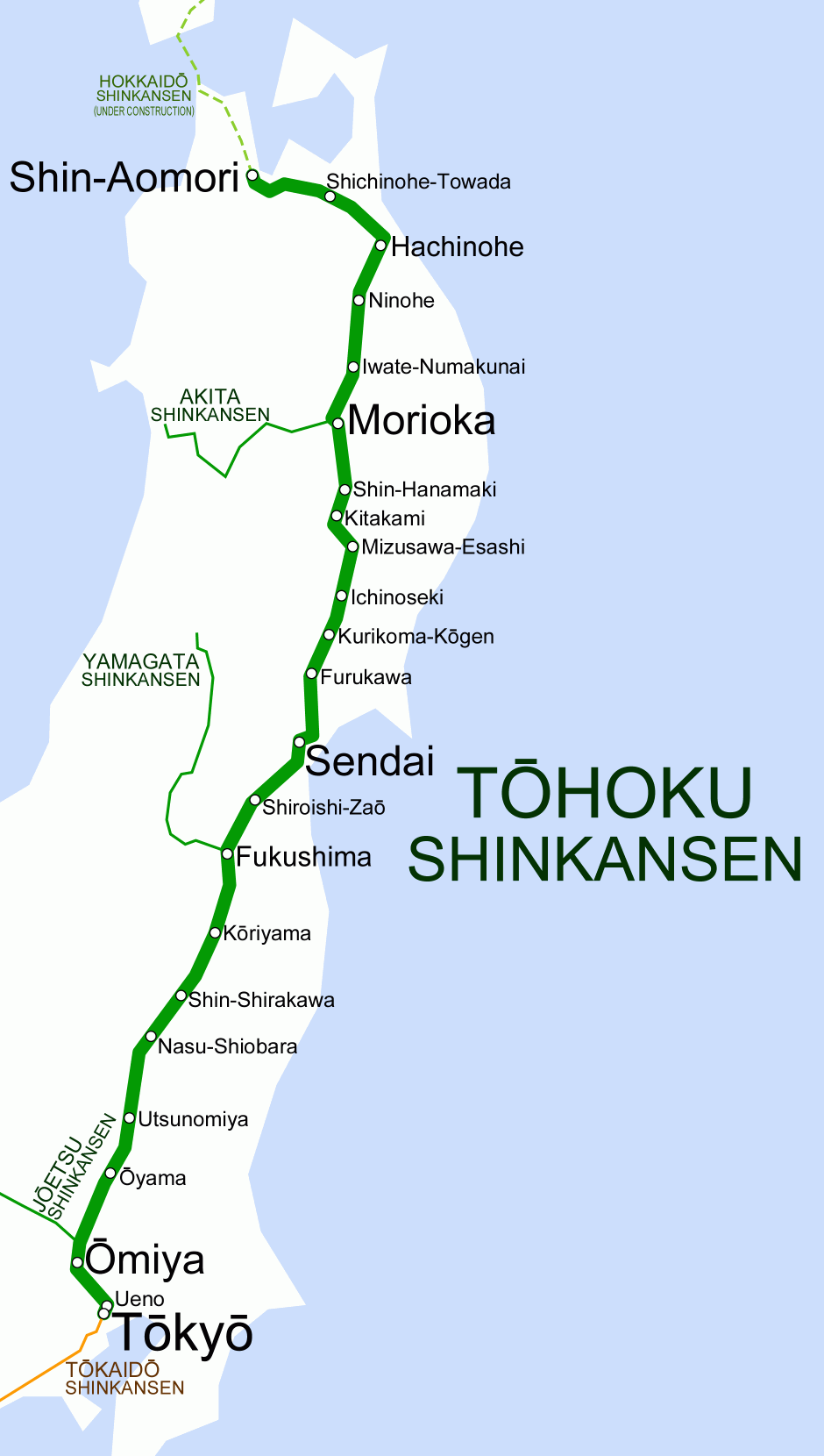
- Nasu tunnel on Route map of Tōhoku Shinkansen line
- Interactive map of Nasu Railway Tunnel

Overview
- Line: Tōhoku Shinkansen
- Location: between Nasushiobara Station and Shin-Shirakawa Station
- Coordinates: 37°3′55.0764″N 140°8′2.5692″E
- Status: active

Operation
- Opened: 1982
- Operator: East Japan Railway Company
- Traffic: Railway
- Character: Passenger and Freight

Technical
- Line length: 7.030 km (4.368 mi)
- No. of tracks: 2

Nasu Tunnel (那須トンネル, Nasu tonneru) is a tunnel on Tōhoku Shinkansen operated by East Japan Railway Company located between Nasushiobara Station and Shin-Shirakawa Station with total length of 7.030 km. It was built and completed in 1982.

== See also ==
- List of tunnels in Japan
- Seikan Tunnel undersea tunnel between Honshu-Hokkaido islands
- Kanmon Railway Tunnel undersea tunnel between Honshu-Kyushu islands
- Sakhalin–Hokkaido Tunnel proposed undersea tunnel between Rusia and Japan
- Bohai Strait tunnel proposed undersea tunnel in Yellow Sea, China
