= Rokujurigoe Tunnel =

Railway tunnel in Honshu, Japan

Rokujurigoe Railway Tunnel
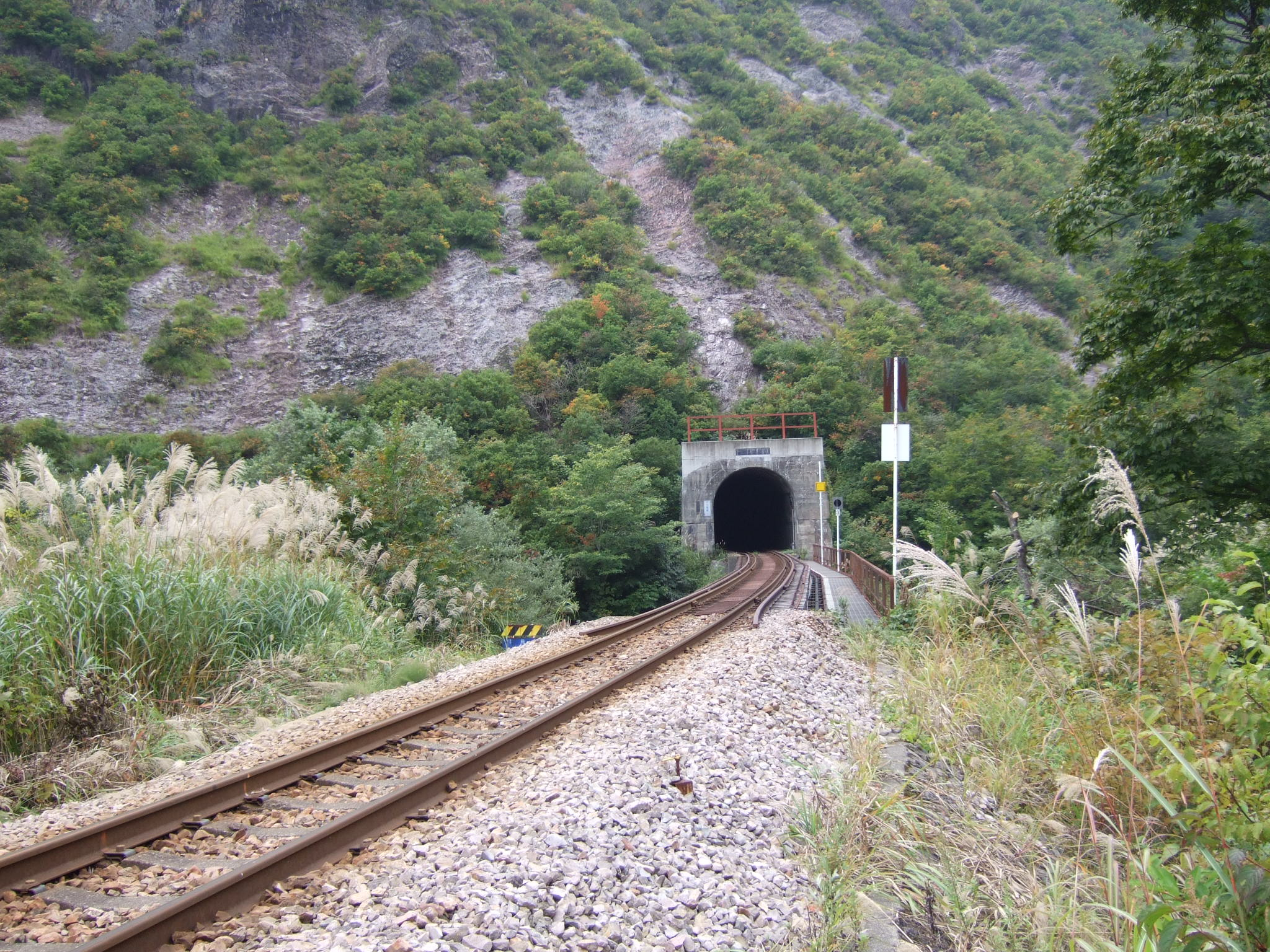
- Rokujurigoe Tunnel
- Interactive map of Rokujurigoe Railway Tunnel

Overview
- Line: Tadami Line
- Location: between Tadami Station and Ōshirakawa Station
- Coordinates: 37°18′45.6156″N 139°12′59.1516″E
- Status: active

Operation
- Opened: 1971
- Operator: East Japan Railway Company
- Traffic: Railway
- Character: Passenger and Freight

Technical
- Line length: 6,359 m (20,863 ft)
- No. of tracks: 2

Rokujurigoe Tunnel on Tadami Line

Rokujurigoe Tunnel (六十里越トンネル, Rokujurigoe tonneru) is a tunnel on JR East's Tadami Line that runs through Mt. Asakusa of Echigo Mountains between Tadami Station (只見駅) and Ōshirakawa Station (大白川駅) on the Niigata Prefecture and Fukushima Prefecture borders with total length of 6.359 km. It was built and completed in 1971.

== See also ==
- List of tunnels in Japan
- Seikan Tunnel undersea tunnel between Honshu-Hokkaido islands
- Kanmon Railway Tunnel undersea tunnel between Honshu-Kyushu islands
- Sakhalin–Hokkaido Tunnel
- Bohai Strait tunnel
