= Makinohara Tunnel =

Railway tunnel in Honshu, Japan

Makinohara Railway Tunnel
- Interactive map of Makinohara Railway Tunnel

Overview
- Line: Tokaido Shinkansen
- Location: between Kakegawa Station and Shizuoka Station
- Coordinates: 34°46′53″N 138°7′43″E
- Status: active

Operation
- Opened: 1968
- Operator: Central Japan Railway Company
- Traffic: Railway
- Character: Passenger and Freight

Technical
- Line length: 2.917 km (1.813 mi)
- No. of tracks: 2

Makinohara Tunnel (牧の原トンネル, Makinohara tonneru) is a tunnel on Tokaido Shinkansen operated by Central Japan Railway Company located in Makinohara city, between Kakegawa Station and Shizuoka Station with total length of 2.917 km. It was built and completed in 1968.

== See also ==
- List of tunnels in Japan
- Seikan Tunnel undersea tunnel between Honshu-Hokkaido islands
- Kanmon Railway Tunnel undersea tunnel between Honshu-Kyushu islands
- Sakhalin–Hokkaido Tunnel proposed undersea tunnel between Rusia and Japan
- Bohai Strait tunnel proposed undersea tunnel in Yellow Sea, China
