= Haneda Tunnel =

Railway tunnel in Honshu, Japan

Haneda Railway Tunnel
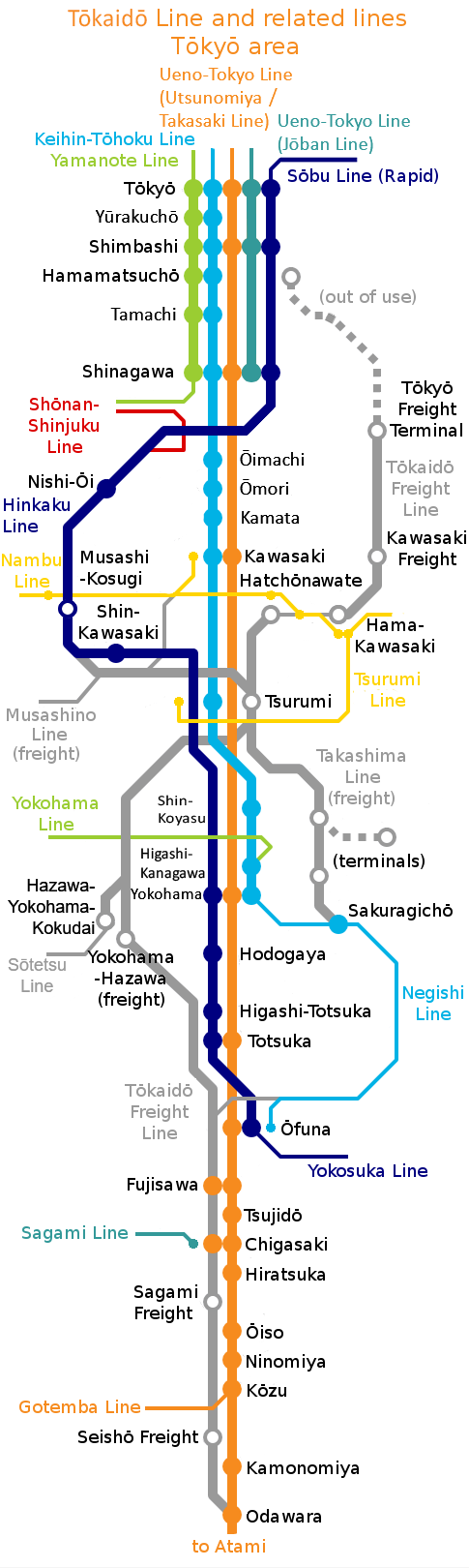
- Haneda Tunnel & Tokyo Freight Terminal on the Tōkaidō Freight Line
- Interactive map of Haneda Railway Tunnel

Overview
- Line: Tokaido Freight Line
- Location: between Tokyo Freight Terminal and Kawasaki Freight
- Coordinates: 35°33′58.1934″N 139°45′11.2746″E
- Status: active

Operation
- Opened: 1973
- Operator: Japan Freight Railway Company
- Traffic: Railway
- Character: Freight

Technical
- Line length: 6,472 m (21,234 ft)
- No. of tracks: 2

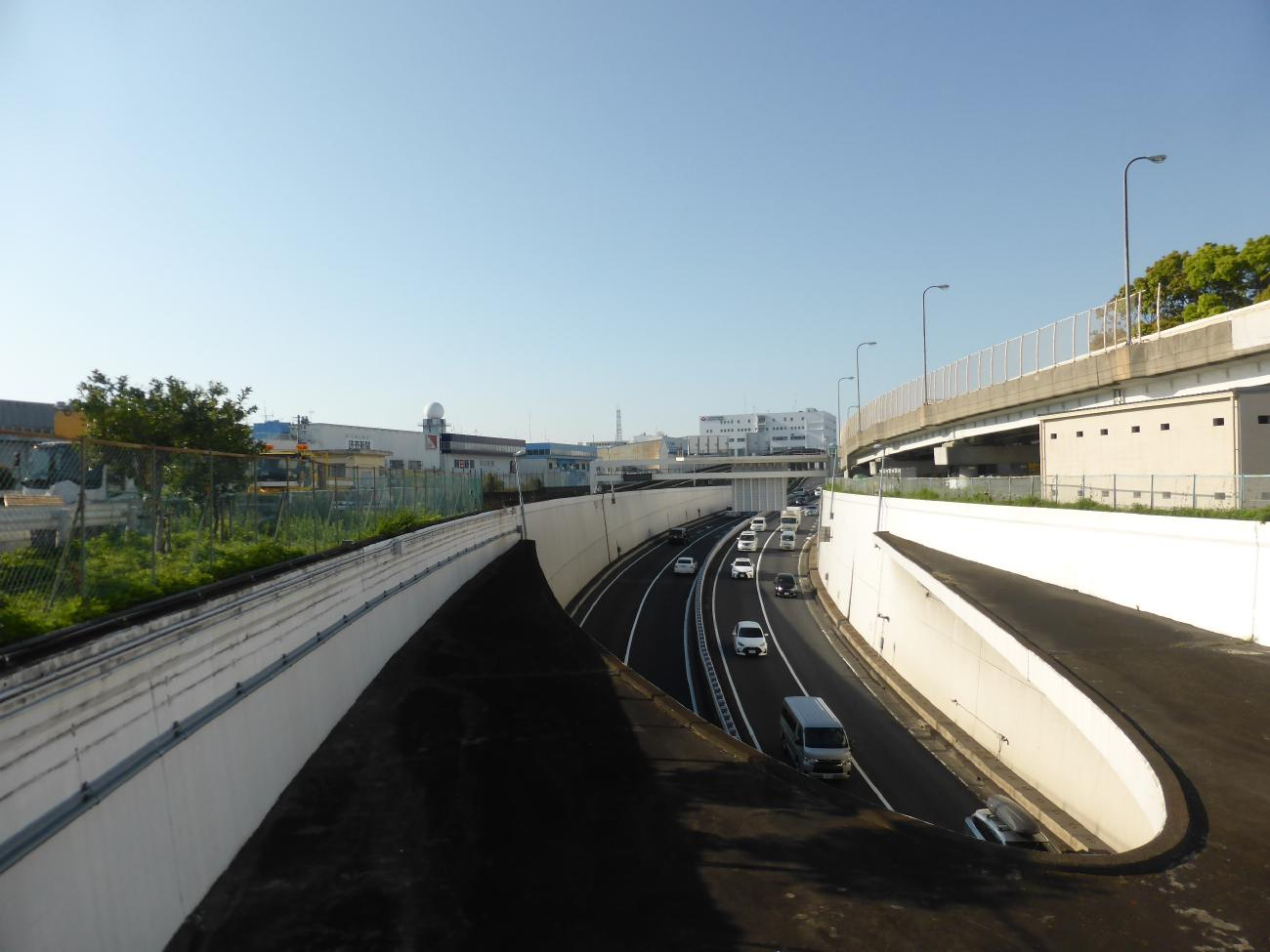
Haneda Tunnel entrance/exit on the Haneda side

Haneda Tunnel (羽田トンネル, Haneda tonneru) is a tunnel on Tokaido Freight Line operated by Japan Freight Railway Company located between Tokyo Freight Terminal and Kawasaki Freight under Haneda Airport area with total length of 6.472 km (4.022 mi). It was built and completed in 1973.

== See also ==
- List of tunnels in Japan
- Seikan Tunnel undersea tunnel between Honshu-Hokkaido islands
- Kanmon Railway Tunnel undersea tunnel between Honshu-Kyushu islands
- Sakhalin–Hokkaido Tunnel proposed undersea tunnel between Rusia and Japan
- Bohai Strait tunnel proposed undersea tunnel in Yellow Sea, China
