= Zao Tunnel =

Railway tunnel in Honshu, Japan

Zao Railway Tunnel
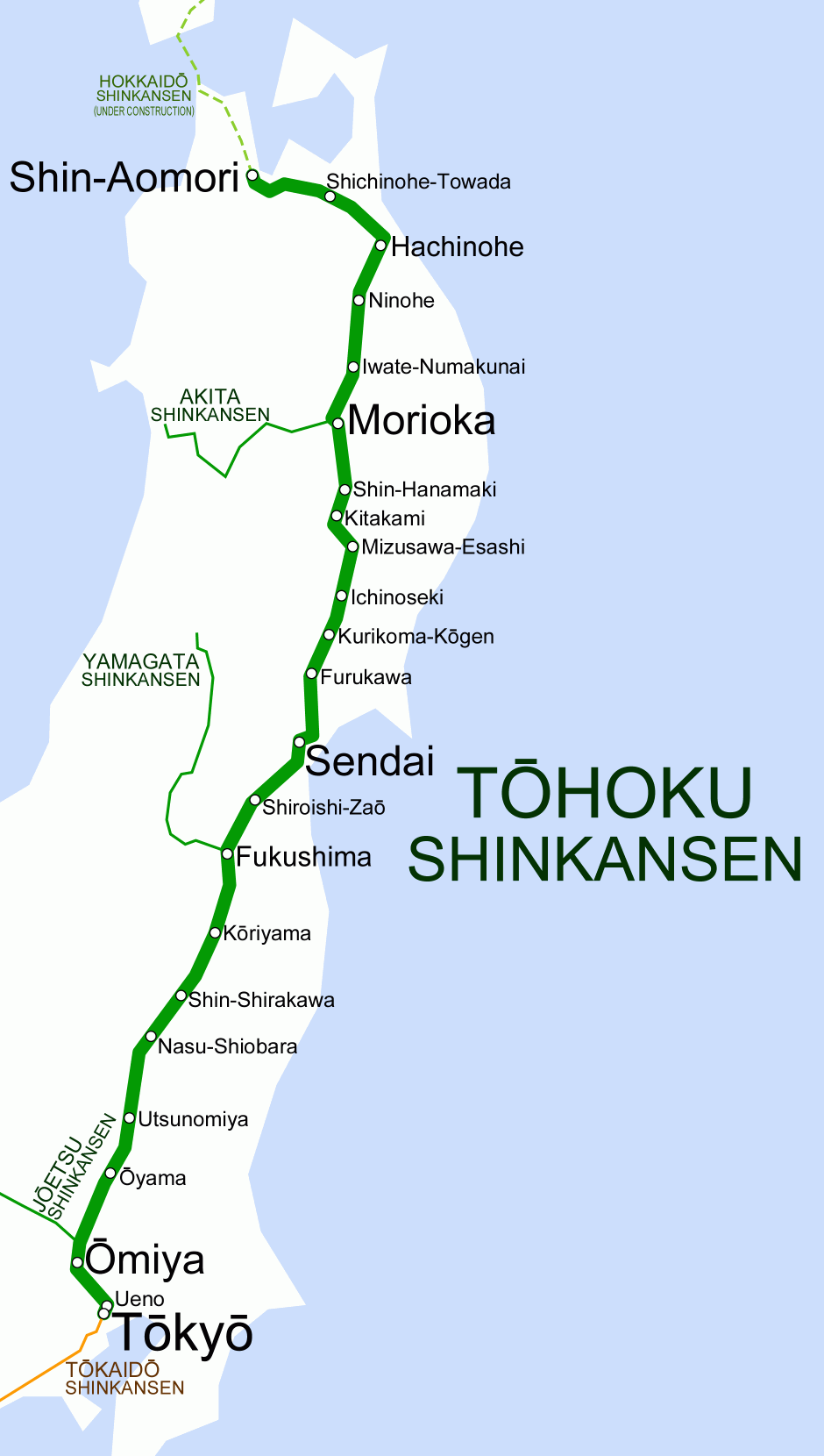
- Zao tunnel on Tohoku Shinkansen line
- Interactive map of Zao Railway Tunnel

Overview
- Line: Tōhoku Shinkansen
- Location: between Kunimi, Fukushima and Saikawa Kajikawa, Shiroishi, Miyagi
- Coordinates: 37°56′32.3874″N 140°35′16.2888″E
- Status: active
- Start: February 1972

Operation
- Opened: June 23, 1982
- Owner: East Japan Railway Company (JR East)
- Operator: East Japan Railway Company
- Traffic: Railway
- Character: Passenger and Freight

Technical
- Line length: 11,215 m (36,795 ft)
- No. of tracks: 2
- Track gauge: 1,435 mm ( standard gauge )
- Electrified: Yes ( AC 25,000 V /50 Hz )
- Operating speed: 320km/h
- Grade: 6 ‰ (max)

Zao Tunnel (蔵王トンネル, Zao tonneru) is a tunnel on Tōhoku Shinkansen that runs from Yamazakiarasawa, Kunimi town, Date district in Fukushima prefecture to Saikawa-Kajikawa, Shiroishi City in Miyagi Prefecture with total length of 11.215 km. It was built and completed in 1982.

== See also ==
- List of tunnels in Japan
- Seikan Tunnel undersea tunnel between Honshu-Hokkaido islands
- Kanmon Railway Tunnel undersea tunnel between Honshu-Kyushu islands
- Sakhalin–Hokkaido Tunnel
- Bohai Strait tunnel
