= Yakushitoge Tunnel =

Railway tunnel in Honshu, Japan

Yakushitoge Railway Tunnel
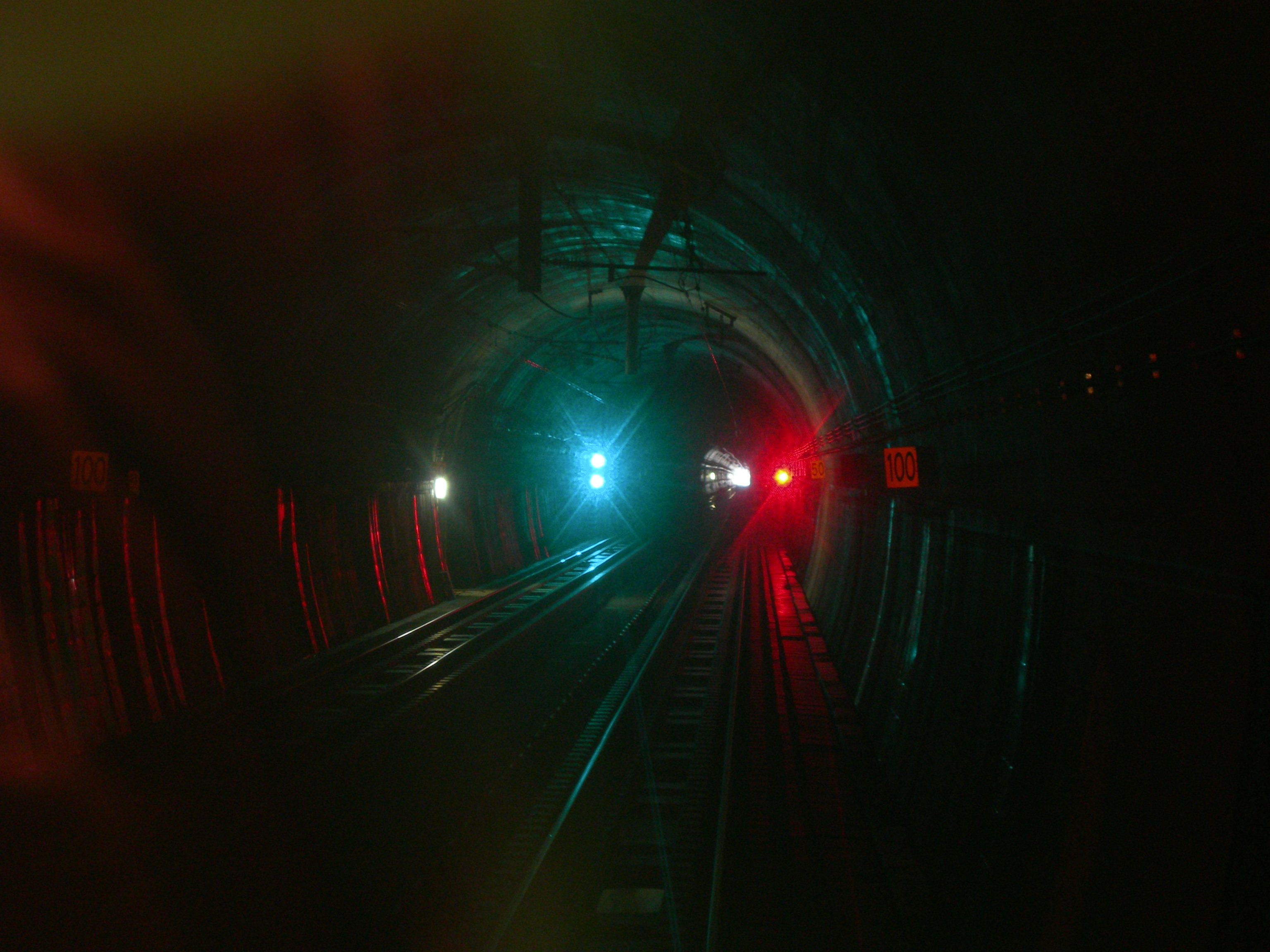
- Yakushitoge tunnel on Hokuhoku Line
- Interactive map of Yakushitoge Railway Tunnel

Overview
- Line: Hokuhoku Line
- Location: between Matsudai Station and Tokamachi Station
- Coordinates: 37°7′45.6666″N 138°41′2.8026″E
- Status: active

Operation
- Opened: 1997
- Operator: Hokuetsu Express
- Traffic: Railway
- Character: Passenger and Freight

Technical
- Line length: 6,119 m (20,075 ft)
- No. of tracks: 2
- Track gauge: 1,067 mm (3 ft 6 in)

Yakushitoge Tunnel (薬師峠トンネル, Yakushitoge tonneru) is a tunnel on Hokuhoku Line that runs through Yakushi mountains in Tokamachi city, Niigata prefecture with total length of 6.119 km. It was built and completed in 1997.

== See also ==
- List of tunnels in Japan
- Seikan Tunnel undersea tunnel between Honshu-Hokkaido islands
- Kanmon Railway Tunnel undersea tunnel between Honshu-Kyushu islands
- Sakhalin–Hokkaido Tunnel
- Bohai Strait tunnel
