= Izumigoshi Tunnel =

Railway tunnel in Honshu, Japan

Izumigoshi Railway Tunnel
- Interactive map of Izumigoshi Railway Tunnel

Overview
- Line: Tokaido Shinkansen
- Location: between Atami Station and Odawara Station
- Coordinates: 35°7′27″N 139°5′15″E
- Status: active

Operation
- Opened: 1963
- Operator: Central Japan Railway Company
- Traffic: Railway
- Character: Passenger and Freight

Technical
- Line length: 3.193 km (1.984 mi)
- No. of tracks: 2

Izumigoshi Tunnel (泉越トンネル, Izumigoshi tonneru) is a tunnel on Tokaido Shinkansen operated by Central Japan Railway Company located between Atami Station and Odawara Station with total length of 3.193 km. It was built and completed in 1963.

== See also ==
- List of tunnels in Japan
- Seikan Tunnel undersea tunnel between Honshu-Hokkaido islands
- Kanmon Railway Tunnel undersea tunnel between Honshu-Kyushu islands
- Sakhalin–Hokkaido Tunnel proposed undersea tunnel between Rusia and Japan
- Bohai Strait tunnel proposed undersea tunnel in Yellow Sea, China
