= Sengan Tunnel =

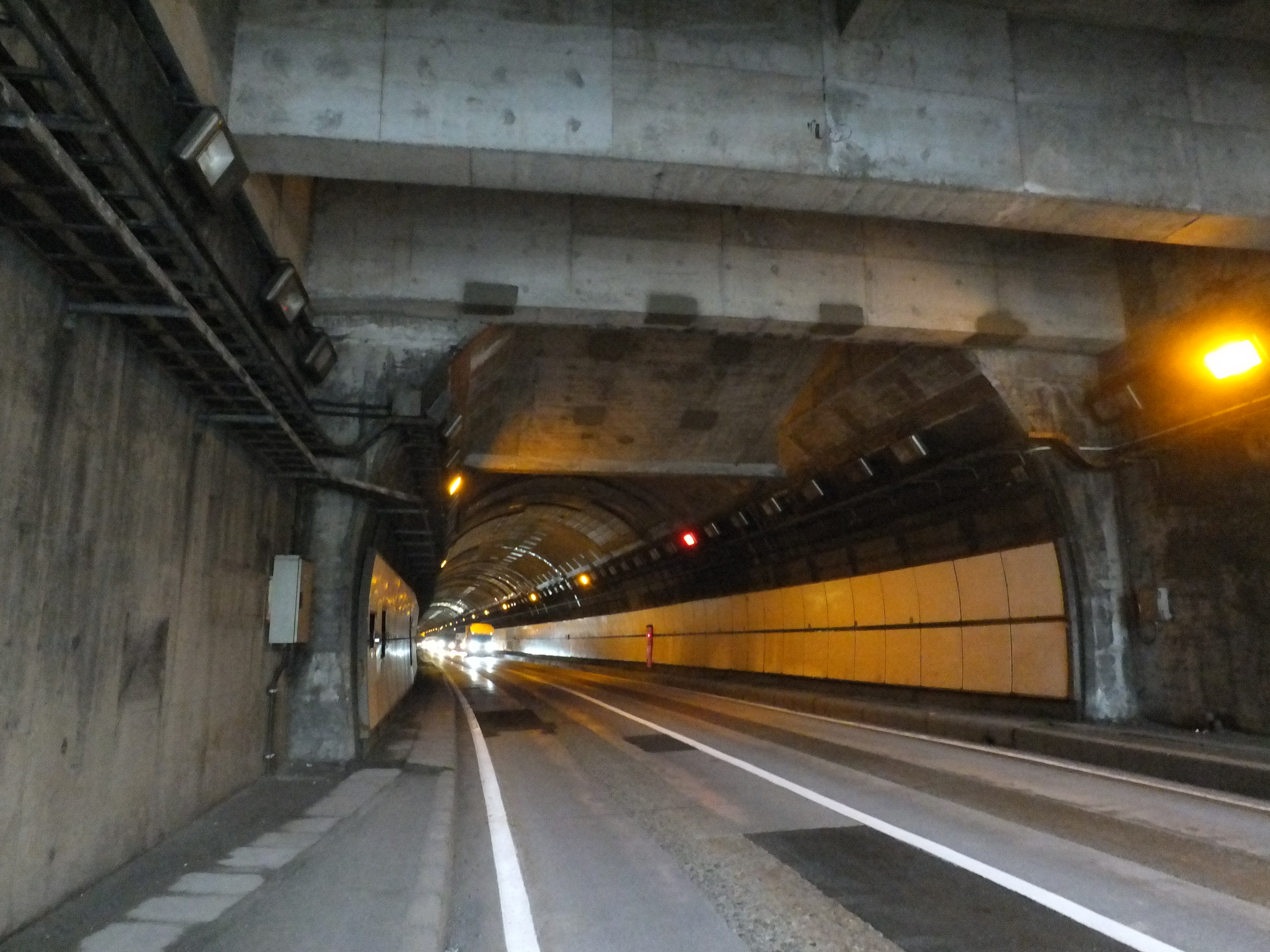
- Sengan tunnel on Iwate side
- Interactive map of Sengan Tunnel

Overview
- Line: Japan National Route 46
- Location: between Iwate prefecture and Akita prefecture borders
- Coordinates: 39°42′28.3422″N 140°48′57.0348″E
- Status: active

Operation
- Opened: 1975

Technical
- Length: 2.544 km (1.581 mi)
- No. of lanes: 2

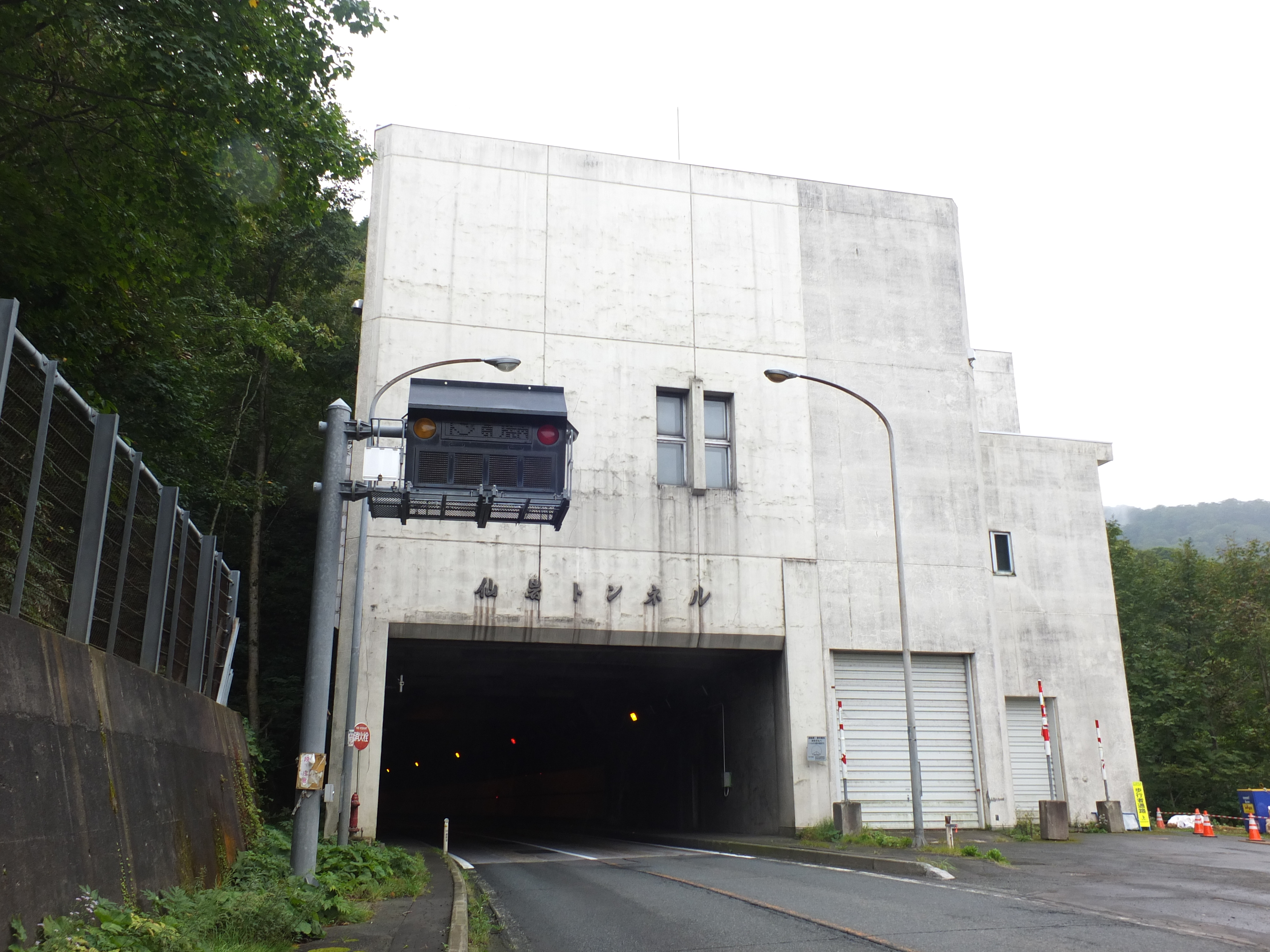
Sengan tunnel ventilation

Sengan Tunnel (仙岩トンネル) is a tunnel on National Sengan Road #46 in northern Japan that runs between Iwate prefecture and Akita prefecture borders with approximate length of 2.544 km. It was completed and opened in 1975.

== See also ==
- List of tunnels in Japan
- Seikan Tunnel Tappi Shakō Line
- Sakhalin–Hokkaido Tunnel
- Bohai Strait tunnel
