= Akakura Tunnel =

Railway tunnel in Honshu, Japan

Akakura Railway Tunnel
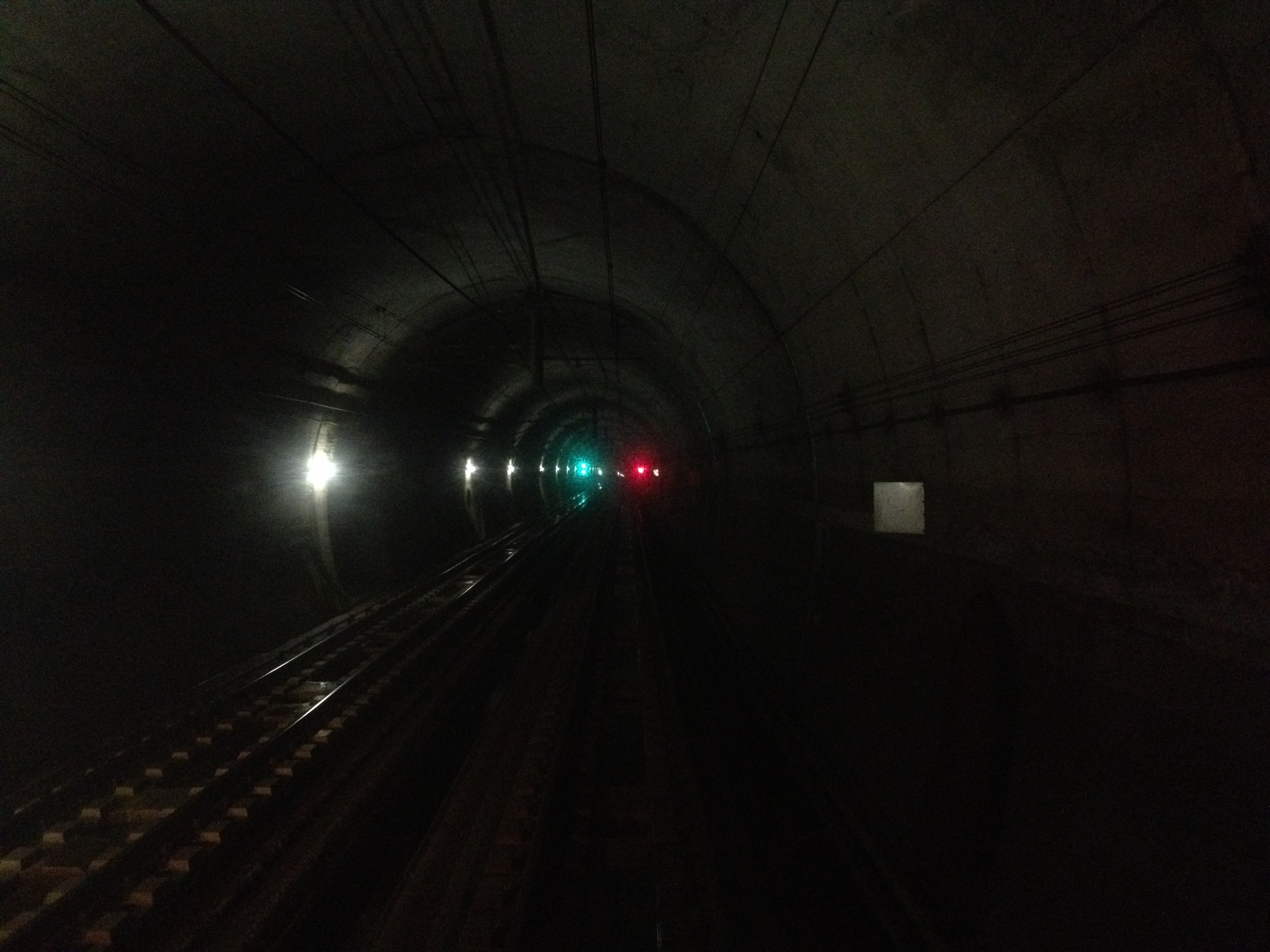
- Akakura tunnel on Hokuhoku Line
- Interactive map of Akakura Railway Tunnel

Overview
- Line: Hokuhoku Line
- Location: between Uonuma-Kyūryō Station and Shinza Station
- Coordinates: 37°7′5.5626″N 138°49′18.2712″E
- Status: active

Operation
- Opened: 1997
- Operator: Hokuetsu Express Railway
- Traffic: Railway
- Character: Passenger and Freight

Technical
- Line length: 10,472 m (34,357 ft)
- No. of tracks: 2
- Track gauge: 1,067 mm (3 ft 6 in)

Akakura Tunnel (赤倉トンネル, Akakura tonneru) is a tunnel on Hokuhoku Line that runs through Mt. Kasagi from Noda, Minamiuonuma city, Niigata Prefecture to Niizako, Tokamachi city, Niigata Prefecture with total length of 10.472 km. It was built and completed in 1997.

== See also ==
- List of tunnels in Japan
- Seikan Tunnel Tappi Shakō Line
- Sakhalin–Hokkaido Tunnel
- Bohai Strait tunnel
