= Tsugaru Tunnel =

Railway tunnel in Honshu, Japan

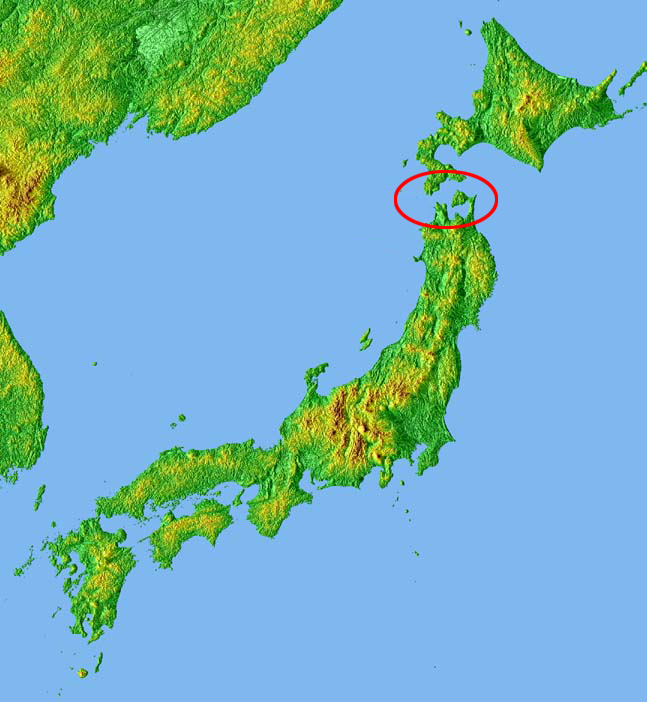
- Tsugaru Tunnel location before Seikan Tunnel
- Interactive map of Tsugaru Tunnel

Overview
- Line: Tsugaru-Kaikyō Line
- Location: between Sotogahama and Imabetsu
- Coordinates: 41°6′41.8386″N 140°31′44.7528″E
- Status: active

Operation
- Operator: Hokkaido Railway Company
- Character: Passenger and Freight

Technical
- Line length: 5.880 km (3.654 mi)
- No. of tracks: 2

Tsugaru Tunnel (津軽トンネル (つがるトンネル), Tsugaru Ton'neru) is a tunnel on the JR's Tsugaru-Kaikyō Line of the Hokkaido Railway Company in Japan that runs from Sotogahama-cho to Imabetsu-cho in Aomori prefecture with an approximate length of 5.880 km.

== See also ==
- List of tunnels in Japan
- Seikan Tunnel Tappi Shakō Line
- Sakhalin–Hokkaido Tunnel
- Bohai Strait tunnel
