= Shiozawa Tunnel =

Railway tunnel in Honshu, Japan

Shiozawa Railway Tunnel
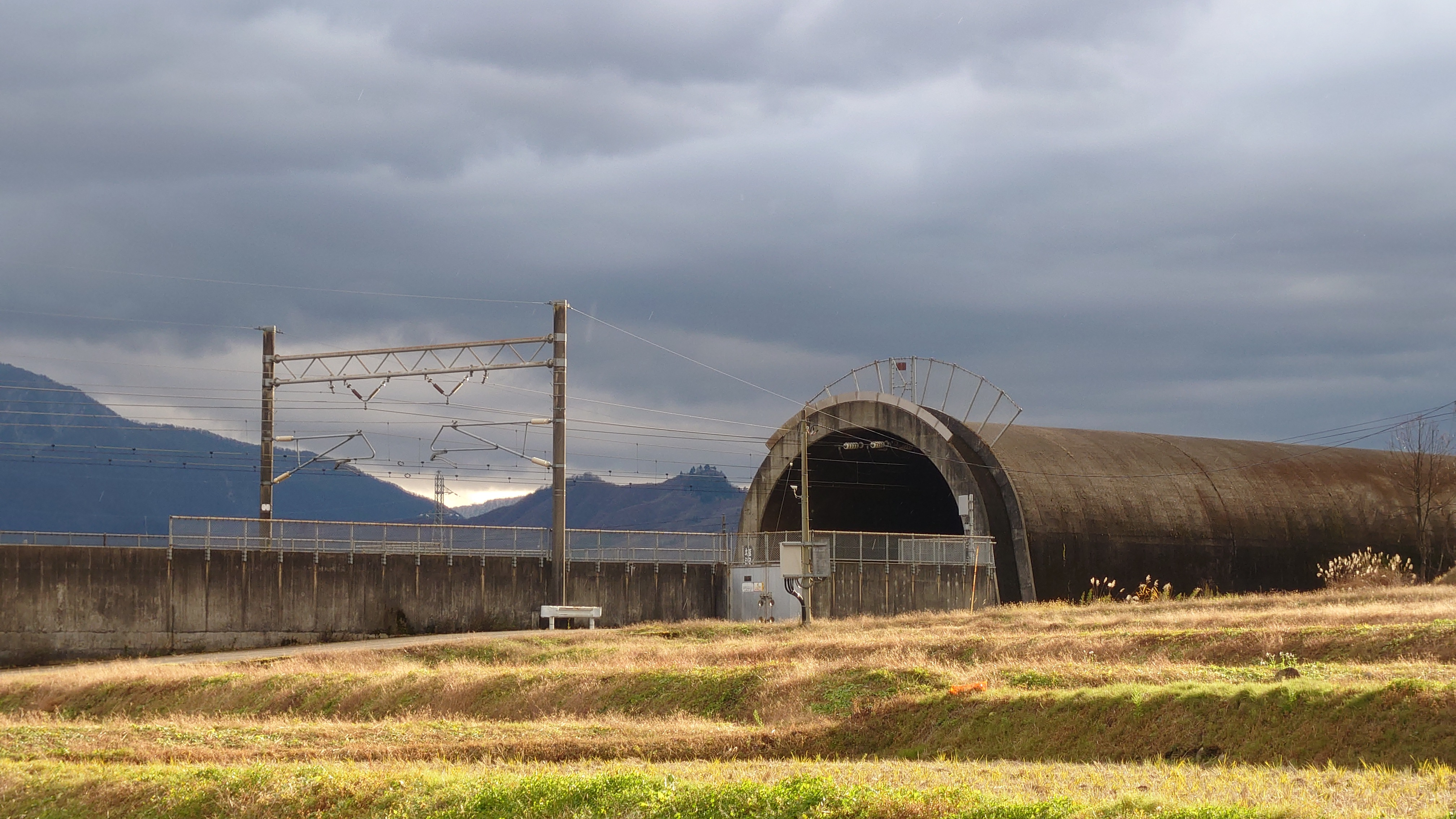
- 塩沢トンネル / Shiozawa Tunnel
- Interactive map of Shiozawa Railway Tunnel

Overview
- Line: Jōetsu Shinkansen
- Location: between Yoshiri, Minamiuonuma and Shiroyama shinden, Minamiuonuma
- Coordinates: 37°02′41.4594″N 138°49′44.2086″E
- Status: active

Operation
- Opened: 1982
- Operator: East Japan Railway Company
- Traffic: Railway
- Character: Passenger and Freight

Technical
- Line length: 11,217 m (36,801 ft)
- No. of tracks: 2

Shiozawa Tunnel (塩沢トンネル, Shiozawa tonneru) is a tunnel on Jōetsu Shinkansen that runs from Yoshiri, Minamiuonuma city and Shiroyama shinden, Minamiuonuma city in Niigata Prefecture with total length of 11.217 km. It was built and completed in 1982.

== See also ==
- List of tunnels in Japan
- Seikan Tunnel undersea tunnel between Honshu-Hokkaido islands
- Kanmon Railway Tunnel undersea tunnel between Honshu-Kyushu islands
- Sakhalin–Hokkaido Tunnel
- Bohai Strait tunnel
