= Nagasaki Tunnel =

Railway tunnel in Nagasaki prefecture, Japan

Nagasaki Railway Tunnel
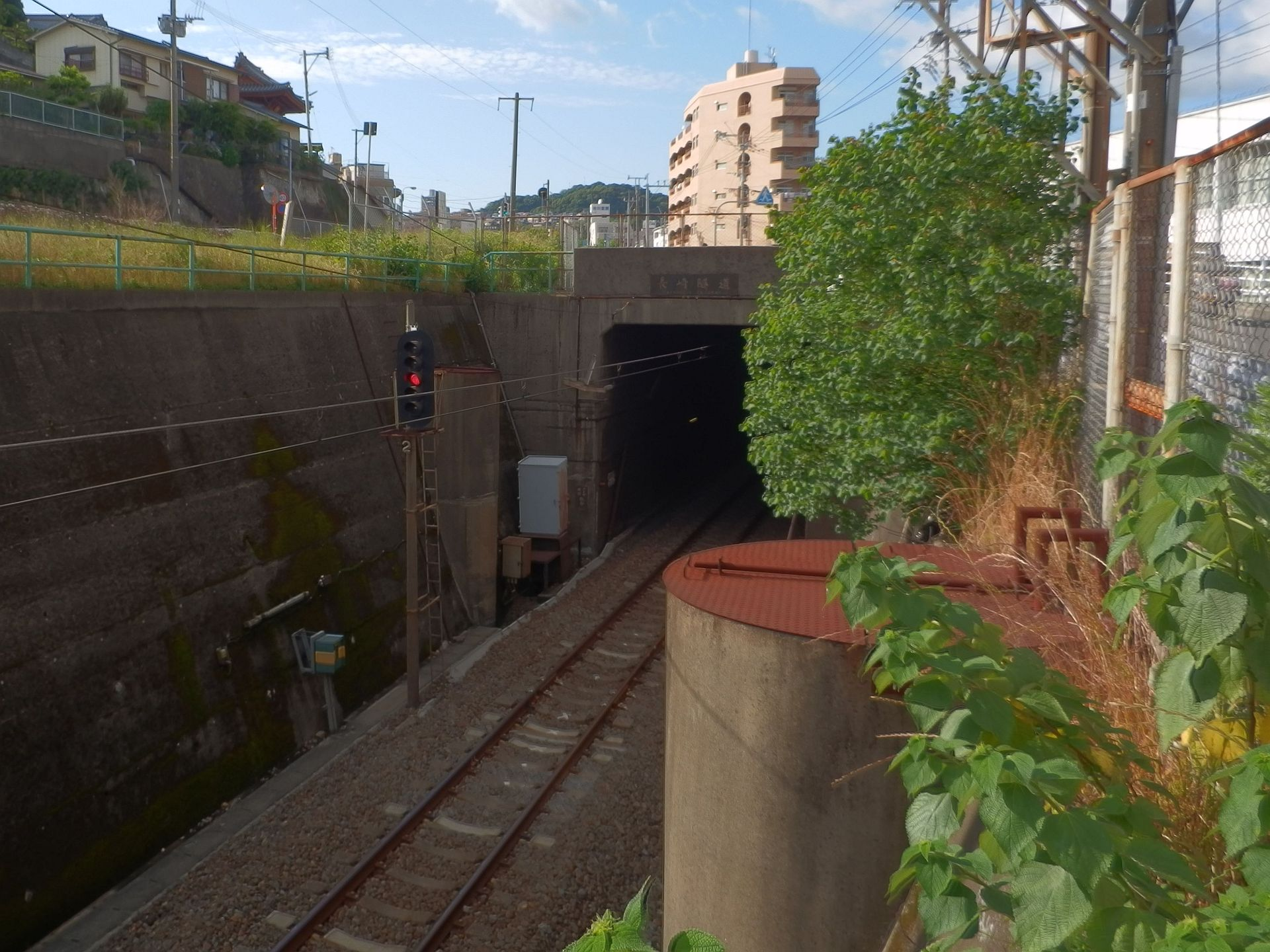
- JR Nagasaki Tunnel
- Interactive map of Nagasaki Railway Tunnel

Overview
- Line: Nagasaki Main Line
- Location: between Urakami Station and Utsutsugawa Station
- Coordinates: 32°47′28″N 129°55′35″E
- Status: active

Operation
- Opened: 1972
- Operator: Kyushu Railway Company
- Traffic: Railway
- Character: Passenger and Freight

Technical
- Line length: 6,173 m (20,253 ft)
- No. of tracks: 2

Nagasaki Tunnel (長崎トンネル, Nagasaki tonneru) is a tunnel on JR Nagasaki Main Line that runs from Genkawa Station to Urakami Station in Nagasaki city, Nagasaki prefecture with total length of 6.173 km. It was built and completed in 1972.

== See also ==
- List of tunnels in Japan
- Seikan Tunnel Tappi Shakō Line
- Sakhalin–Hokkaido Tunnel
- Bohai Strait tunnel
