= Senzan Tunnel =

Railway tunnel in Honshu, Japan

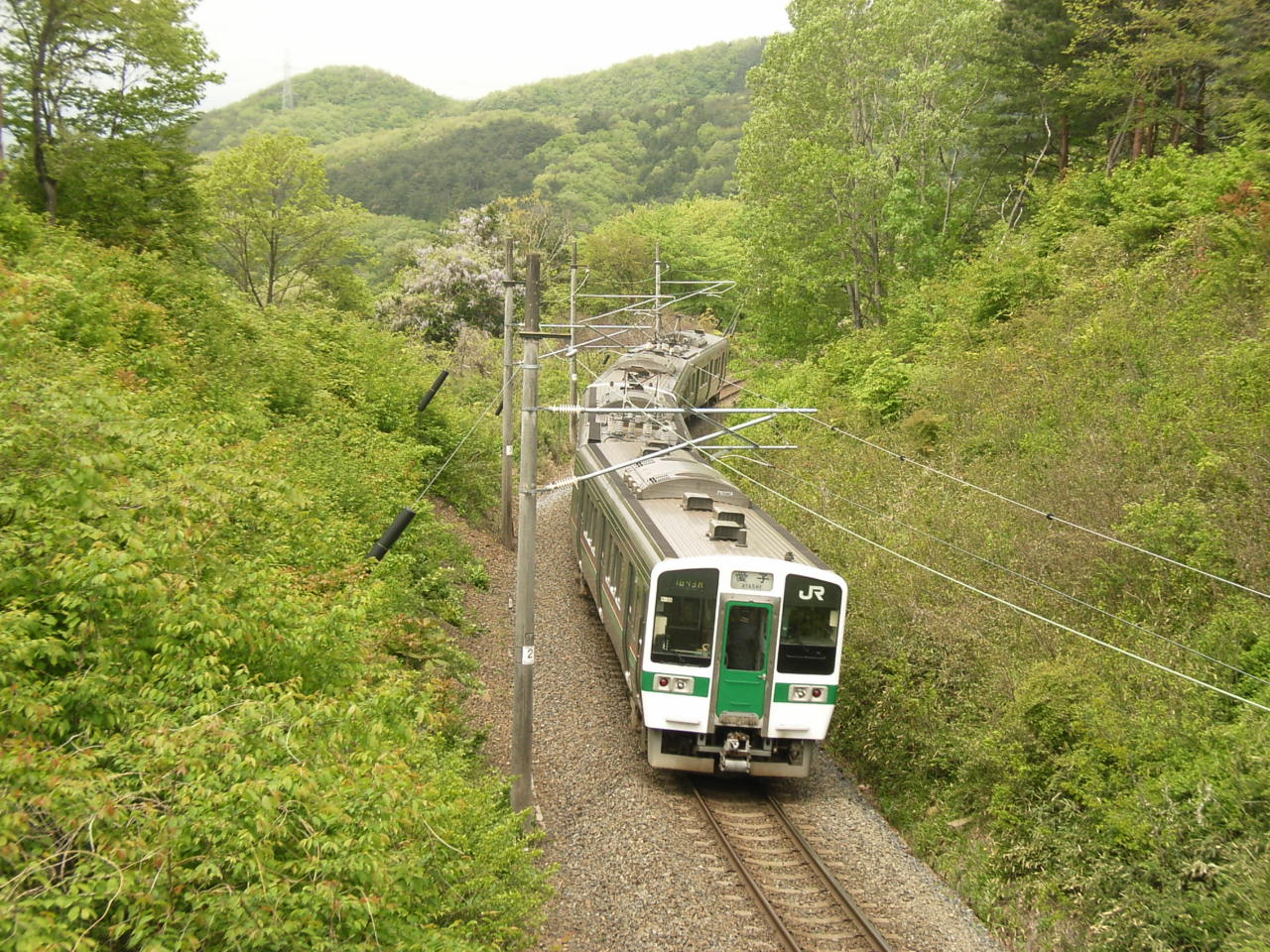
- Train on Senzan Line via Senzan tunnel
- Interactive map of Senzan Tunnel

Overview
- Line: Senzan Line
- Location: between Taihaku-ku, Sendai and Omoshiroyama-Kōgen Station, Yamagata
- Coordinates: 38°19′54.8394″N 140°32′25.8″E
- Status: active

Operation
- Opened: 1937
- Operator: East Japan Railway Company
- Traffic: Railway
- Character: Passenger and Freight

Technical
- Line length: 5.361 km (3.331 mi)
- No. of tracks: 1

Senzan Tunnel (仙山トンネル (せんざんトンネル), Senzan Ton'neru) is a tunnel on Senzan Line in Japan that runs from Taihaku Ward, Sendai city, Miyagi prefecture to Yamagata city, Yamagata prefecture with approximate length of 5.361 km. It was completed and opened in 1937.

== See also ==
- List of tunnels in Japan
- Seikan Tunnel Tappi Shakō Line
- Sakhalin–Hokkaido Tunnel
- Bohai Strait tunnel
