= Kitakyushu Tunnel =

Railway tunnel in Kyushu, Japan

Kitakyushu Railway Tunnel
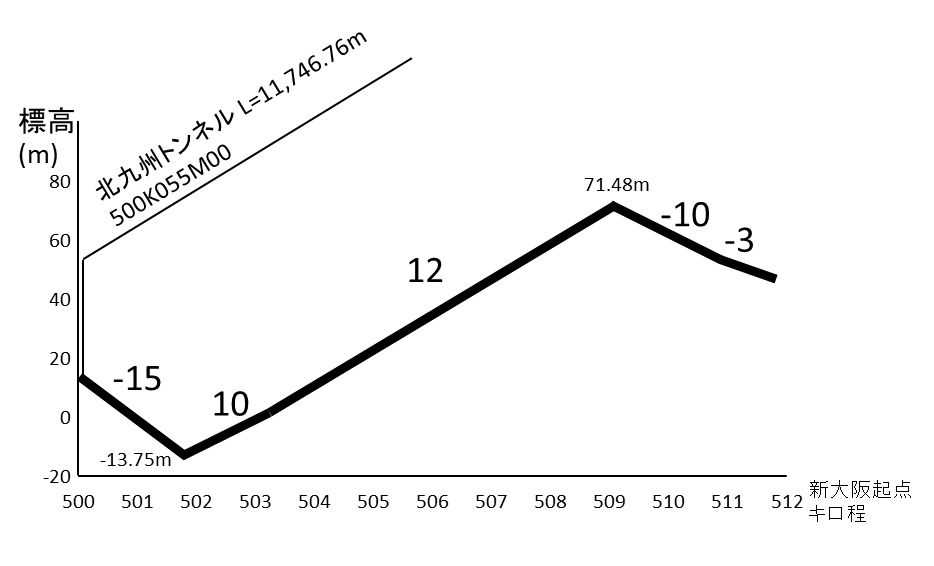
- Kitakyushu Tunnel design & cross sectional drawing
- Interactive map of Kitakyushu Railway Tunnel

Overview
- Line: Sanyo Shinkansen
- Location: Kokurakita-ku, Kitakyūshū–Yahatanishi-ku, Kitakyūshū
- Coordinates: 33°53′20.4786″N 130°51′28.6668″E

Operation
- Opened: 1975
- Operator: West Japan Railway Company
- Character: Passenger and freight

Technical
- Line length: 11,747 m (38,540 ft)

Kitakyushu Tunnel (北九州トンネル, Kitakyushu tonneru) is a railway tunnel on JR's Sanyo Shinkansen line located between Midorigaoka, Kokura-kita Ward and Kamitsuyaku-higashi, Yahata Nishi Ward, Kitakyushu city in Fukuoka Prefecture with total length of 11.747 km. It was built and completed in 1975.

== See also ==
- List of tunnels in Japan
- Seikan Tunnel undersea tunnel between Honshu-Hokkaido islands
- Kanmon Railway Tunnel undersea tunnel between Honshu-Kyushu islands
- Sakhalin–Hokkaido Tunnel proposed undersea tunnel between Rusia and Japan
- Bohai Strait tunnel proposed undersea tunnel in Yellow Sea, China
