= Kubiki Tunnel =

Railway tunnel in Japan

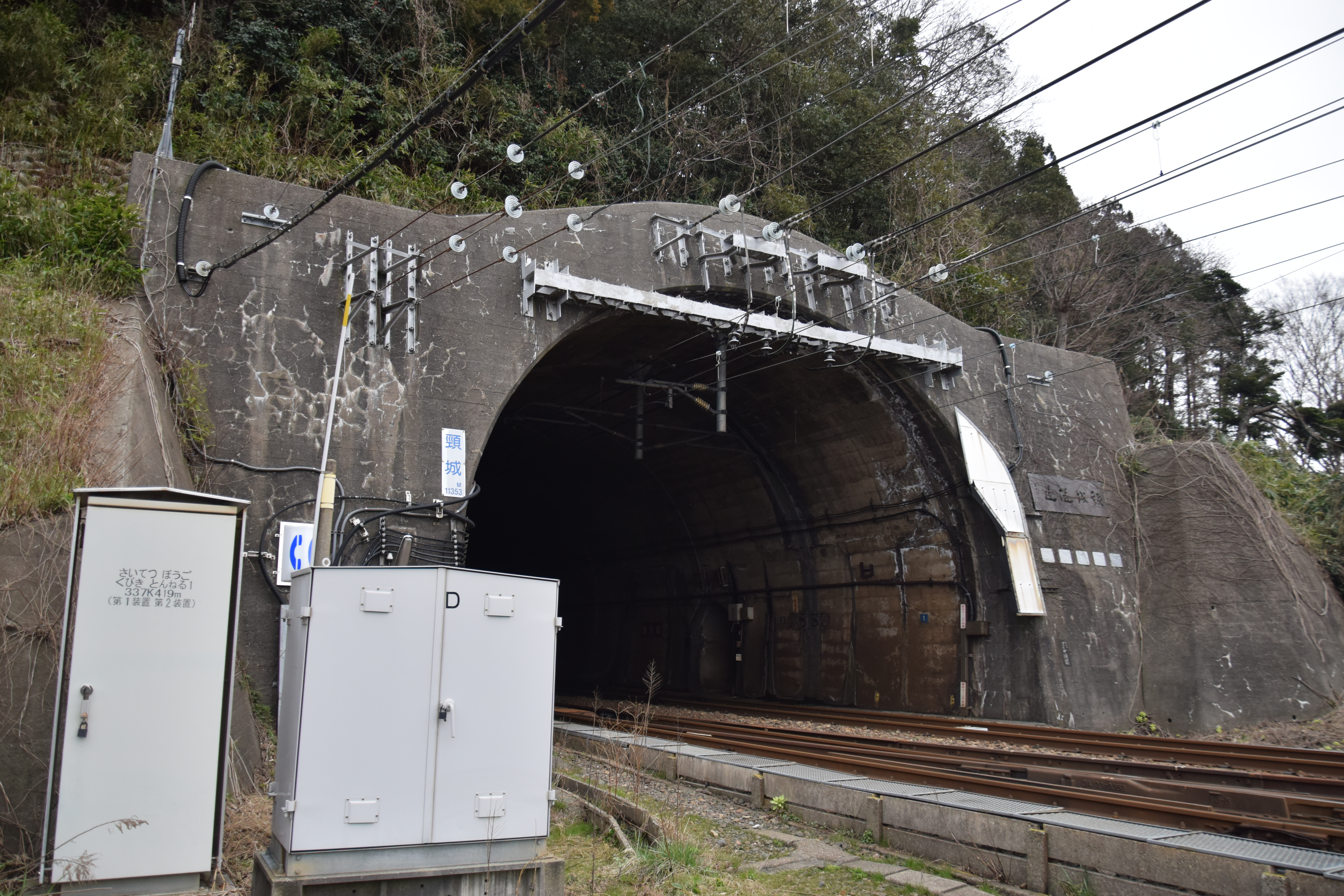
- Kubiki Tunnel in 2019

Overview
- Line: Hokuriku Main Line
- Location: between Nō Station, Itoigawa and Nadachi Station, Niigata prefecture
- Coordinates: 37°7′2.154″N 138°3′2.9232″E
- Status: active

Operation
- Opened: 1969
- Operator: West Japan Railway Company
- Traffic: Railway
- Character: Passenger and Freight

Technical
- Line length: 11,353 m (37,247 ft)
- No. of tracks: 2

Route map
- Kubiki Tunnel

Kubiki Tunnel (頚城トンネル) is a tunnel on JR-West Hokuriku Main Line in Japan that runs between Oazanou, Itoigawa city, Niigata prefecture and Tsuboyama, Nadachi ward, Joetsu city, Niigata prefecture with approximate length of 11.353 km. It was completed and opened in 1969, and officially inscribed by Reisuke Ishida, the president of the Japanese National Railways.

== See also ==
- List of tunnels in Japan
- Seikan Tunnel Tappi Shakō Line
- Sakhalin–Hokkaido Tunnel
- Bohai Strait tunnel
