= Nangosan Tunnel =

Railway tunnel in Honshu, Japan

Nangosan Railway Tunnel
- Interactive map of Nangosan Railway Tunnel

Overview
- Line: Tokaido Shinkansen
- Location: between Atami Station and Odawara Station
- Coordinates: 35°9′54.7194″N 139°6′58.536″E
- Status: active

Operation
- Opened: 1964
- Operator: Central Japan Railway Company
- Traffic: Railway
- Character: Passenger and Freight

Technical
- Line length: 5.170 km (3.212 mi)
- No. of tracks: 2

Nangosan Tunnel (南郷山トンネル, Nangōsan tonneru) is a tunnel under Mount Nangō on Tokaido Shinkansen operated by Central Japan Railway Company located between Atami Station and Odawara Station with total length of 5.170 km. It was built and completed in 1964.

== See also ==
- List of tunnels in Japan
- Seikan Tunnel undersea tunnel between Honshu-Hokkaido islands
- Kanmon Railway Tunnel undersea tunnel between Honshu-Kyushu islands
- Sakhalin–Hokkaido Tunnel proposed undersea tunnel between Rusia and Japan
- Bohai Strait tunnel proposed undersea tunnel in Yellow Sea, China
