= List of tunnels in Japan =

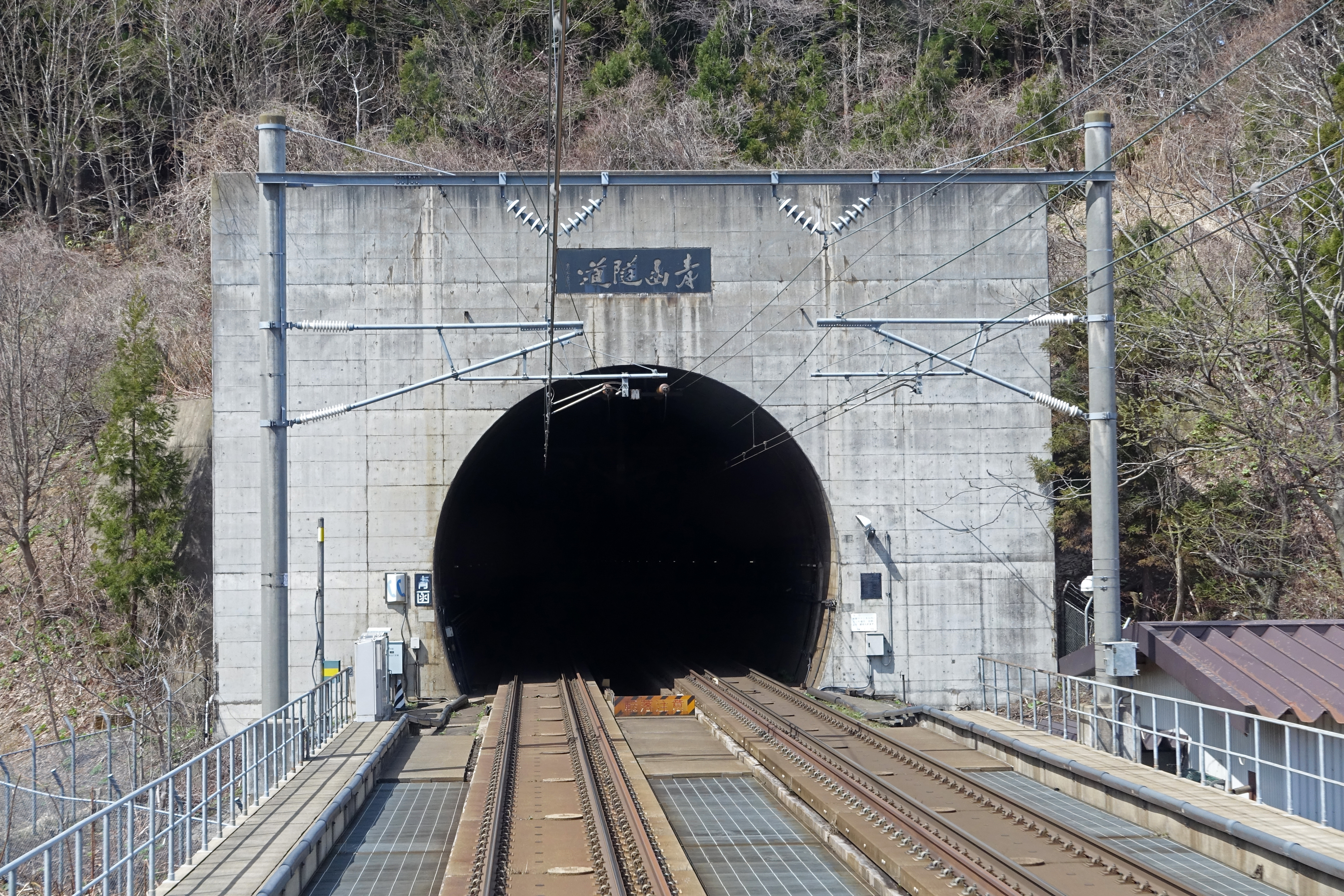
Seikan undersea tunnel entrance on Honshu side.

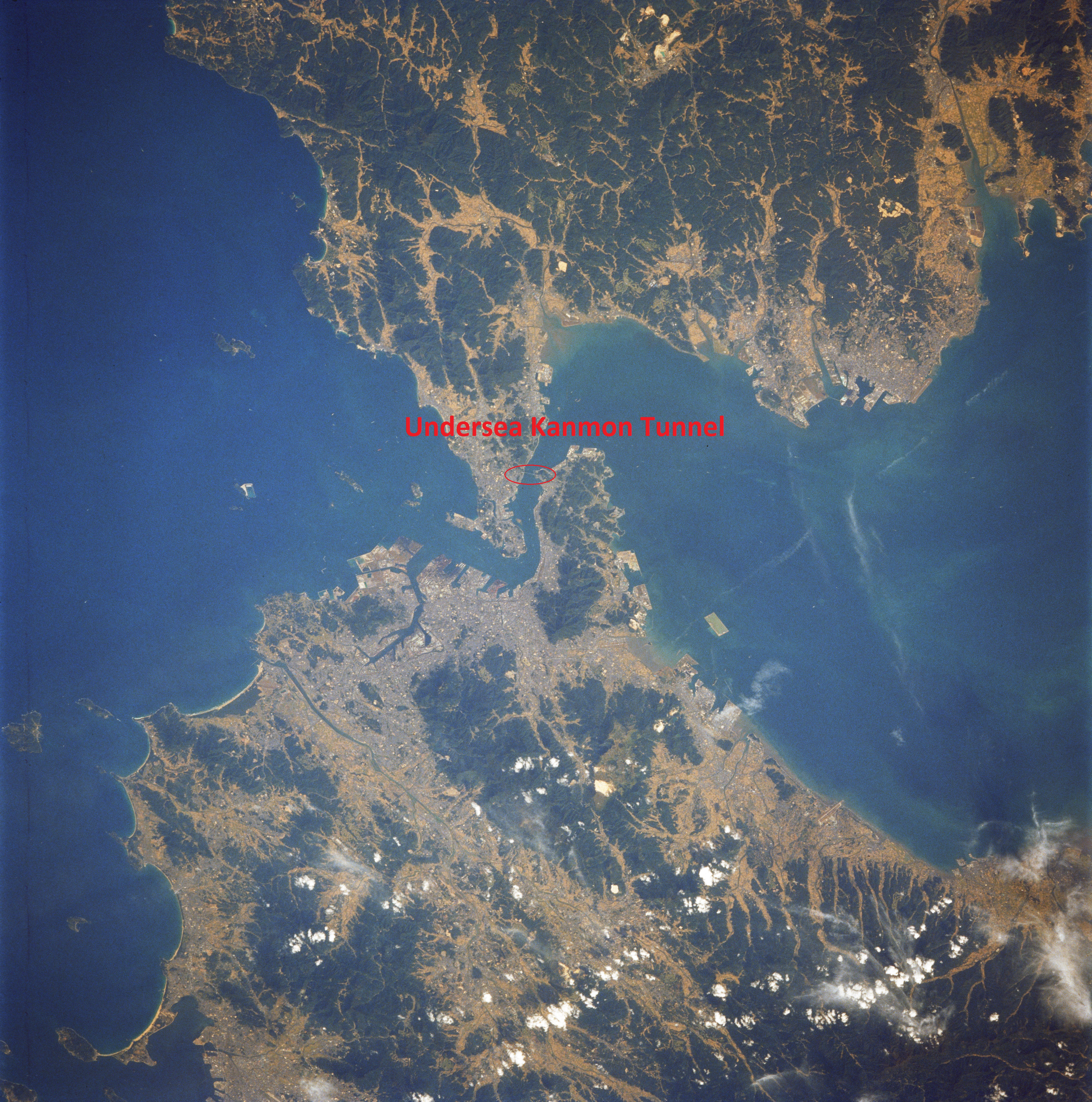
The first undersea Kanmon Railway Tunnel between Honshu and Kyushu islands built in 1936 - 1942.

This list of tunnels in Japan includes any road, rail or waterway tunnel in Japan.

| Tunnel | Opening | Start location | End location | Note |
|---|---|---|---|---|
| Seikan Tunnel - Kaikyō Line | 13 March 1988 | Honshu | Hokkaido | the second longest railway tunnel in the world (~53.85 km) |
| Tsugaru Tunnel - Tsugaru-Kaikyō Line | | Sotogahama-cho in Aomori | Imabetsu-cho in Aomori | ~5.88 km |
| Ichinoseki Tunnel - Tōhoku Shinkansen | 1982 | Ichinoseki Station | | 9.730 km |
| Iwate-Ichinohe Tunnel - Tōhoku Shinkansen | 2002 | Morioka, Iwate | Hachinohe, Aomori | |
| Fukushima Tunnel - Tōhoku Shinkansen | | | | |
| Nasu Tunnel - Tōhoku Shinkansen | 1982 | | | 7.030 km |
| Sannohe Tunnel - Tōhoku Shinkansen | 2002 | Ninohe Station | Hachinohe Station | 8.250 km |
| Zaō Tunnel - Tōhoku Shinkansen | | | | |
| Daishimizu Tunnel - Jōetsu Shinkansen | 1982 | Gunma Prefecture | Niigata Prefecture | |
| Shimizu Tunnel - Jōetsu Line | | Gunma Prefecture | Niigata Prefecture | |
| Shin-Shimizu Tunnel - Jōetsu Line | | | | |
| Tsukiyono Tunnel - Jōetsu Line | | | | 7.295 km |
| Haruna Tunnel - Jōetsu Shinkansen | | | | |
| Nakayama Tunnel - Jōetsu Shinkansen | | | | |
| Shiozawa Tunnel - Jōetsu Shinkansen | | | | |
| Uonuma Tunnel - Jōetsu Shinkansen | | | | |
| Bentenyama Tunnel - Tōkaidō Shinkansen | 1963 | | | 1.316 km |
| Horikoshi Tunnel - Tōkaidō Shinkansen | 1963 | | | 1.415 km |
| Izumigoshi Tunnel - Tōkaidō Shinkansen | 1963 | | | 3.193 km |
| Kanbara Tunnel - Tōkaidō Shinkansen | 1968 | | | 4.934 km |
| Makinohara Tunnel - Tōkaidō Shinkansen | 1968 | | | 2.917 km |
| Nangosan Tunnel - Tōkaidō Shinkansen | 1961 | | | 5.170 km |
| Tanna Tunnel - Tōkaidō Shinkansen | 1934 | Tokyo | Kobe | |
| Shin-Tanna Tunnel (parallel to old Tanna Tunnel) - Tōkaidō Shinkansen | | | | |
| Nihonzaka Tunnel (rail) - Tōkaidō Shinkansen | | | | |
| Otowayama Tunnel - Tōkaidō Shinkansen | | | | 5.045 km |
| Yui Tunnel - Tōkaidō Shinkansen | 1968 | | | 3.993 km |
| Haneda Tunnel - Tōkaidō Freight Line | 1973 | | | 6.472 km |
| Aioi Tunnel - Sanyō Shinkansen | | | | 3.988 km |
| Aki Tunnel - Sanyō Shinkansen | | | | |
| Fukuoka Tunnel - Sanyō Shinkansen | 1975 | | | 8.488 km |
| Hosaka Tunnel - Sanyō Shinkansen | 1975 | | | 7.588 km |
| Kitakyushu Tunnel - Sanyō Shinkansen | 1975 | | | 11.747 km |
| Kobe Tunnel - Sanyō Shinkansen | 1972 | Shin-Kobe Station | Nishi-Akashi Station | 7.970km |
| Kanmon Tunnel - Sanyō Main Line | 1942 | Shimonoseki, Yamaguchi | Kitakyūshū, Fukuoka | |
| Shin-Kanmon Tunnel - Sanyō Shinkansen | | | | |
| Rokko Tunnel - Sanyō Shinkansen | | | | |
| Shin-Noborikawa Tunnel - Sekishō Line | | | | |
| Shin-Karikachi Tunnel - Nemuro Main Line | | | | |
| Senzan Tunnel - Senzan Line | | | | |
| Sengan Tunnel for #46 Road & JR Sengan Tunnel for Akita Shinkansen (Tazawako Line) | | | | |
| Rokujurigoe Tunnel - Tadami Line | | | | |
| Sasago Tunnel - Chūō Expressway | 1977 | Ōtsuki, Yamanashi | Kōshū, Yamanashi | |
| Enrei Tunnel - Chūō Main Line | 1983 | Okaya, Nagano | Shiojiri, Nagano | ~5.994 km |
| Ohara Tunnel - Iida Line | | | | |
| Akima Tunnel - Hokuriku Shinkansen | 1997 | Takasaki | Karuizawa | 8.295 km |
| Gorigamine Tunnel - Hokuriku Shinkansen | 1997 | Ueda | Chikuma | 15.175 km |
| Hokuriku Tunnel - Hokuriku Line | | | | |
| Kubiki Tunnel - Hokuriku Line | | | | |
| Kinuura Tunnel | 1973 | Handa | Hekinan | 1.7 km length |
| Nagasaki Tunnel - Nagasaki Main Line | | | | |
| Masaki Tunnel - Sanriku Railway | | | | |
| Akakura Tunnel - Hokuhoku Line | | | | |
| Nabetateyama Tunnel - Hokuhoku Line | | | | |
| Yakushitoge Tunnel - Hokuhoku Line | | | | |
| Kirigatake Tunnel - Hokuhoku Line | | | | |
| Karisaka Tunnel | 1998 | Chichibu, Saitama | Yamanashi, Yamanashi | |
| Shin-Kobe Tunnel (expressway) | 2012 | Kobe city | Minoya Junction | 8.5 km length |
| Yumesaki Tunnel | 2009 | Sakishima island | Yumeshima island, Osaka | 2.138 km length |
| Kan-Etsu Tunnel - Kan-Etsu Expressway | 1991 | Minakami, Gunma | Yuzawa, Niigata | the longest road tunnel in Japan (~11 km) |
| Hida Tunnel - Tōkai-Hokuriku Expressway | 2008 | Hida city, Gifu | Shirakawa village, Gifu | the second-longest road tunnel in Japan (~10.7 km) |
| Tokyo Bay Aqua-Line bridge-tunnel | 18 December 1997 | Kawasaki, Kanagawa | Kisarazu, Chiba | the third-longest road tunnel in Japan |
| Enasan Tunnel - Chūō Expressway | 1985 | Nagano | Nakatsugawa City, Gifu | the fourth-longest road tunnel in Japan (~8.6 km) |
| Ikuta Tunnel - Musashino Line | 1976 | Ikuta Station | | 10.359 km |

== See also ==
- List of tunnels by location
