= Fukuoka Tunnel =

Railway tunnel in Japan

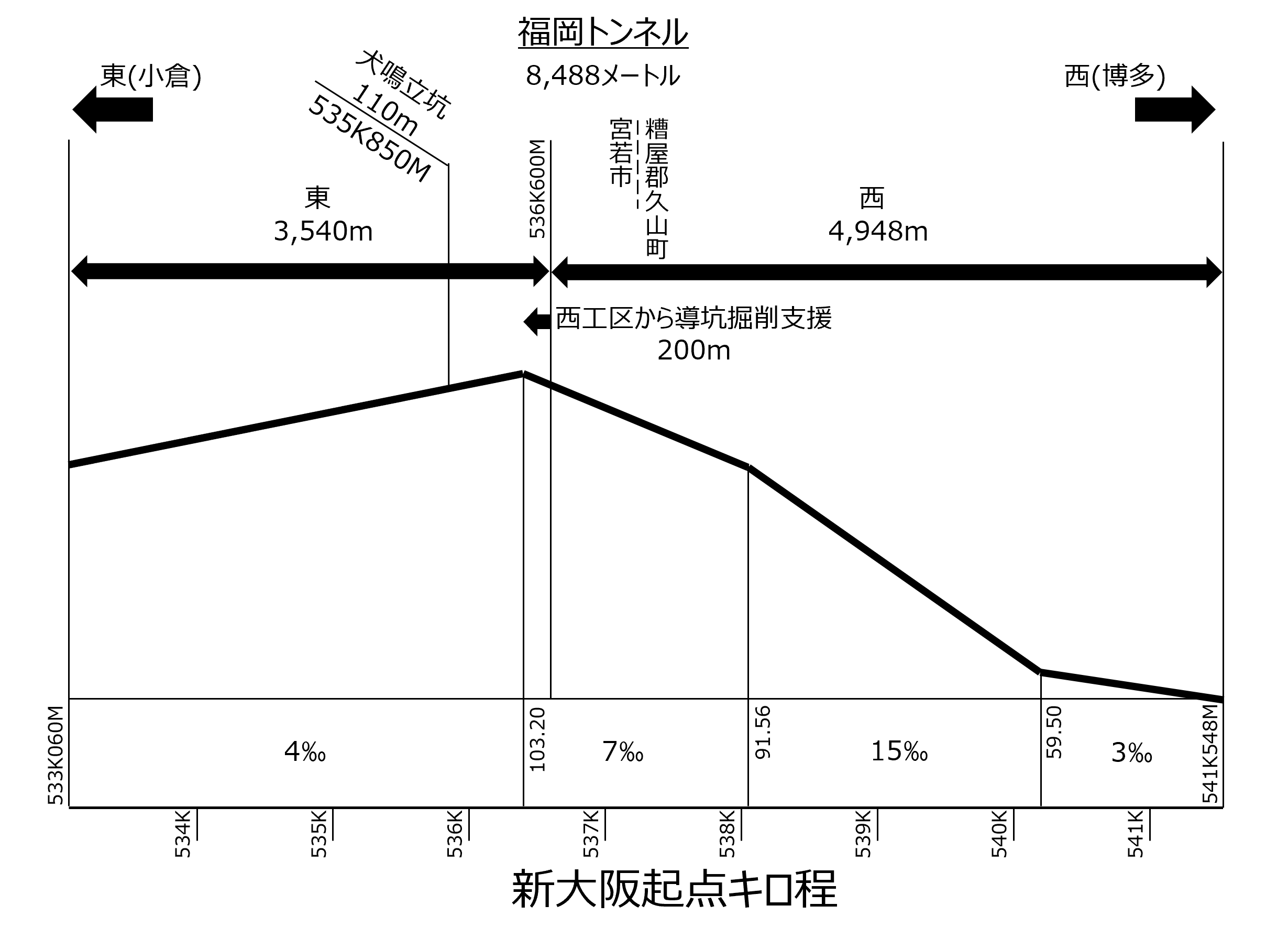
- Fukuoka Tunnel design and vertical alignment
- Interactive map of Fukuoka Tunnel

Overview
- Location: Fukuoka Prefecture
- Coordinates: 33°41′32.5494″N 130°32′52.209″E
- Status: Active

Operation
- Work began: 1970
- Opened: 10 March 1975
- Traffic: Railway

Technical
- Length: 8.488 km (5.274 mi)
- No. of lanes: 2

Fukuoka Tunnel (福岡トンネル, Fukuoka tonneru) is a railway tunnel on JR's Sanyo Shinkansen line running east–west through the Nishiyama and Inunaki mountains. The tunnel is located between Otono, Miyawaka and Oaza Ino, Hisayama, between the Kasuya and Kurate districts in Fukuoka Prefecture. The total length of the tunnel is 8.488 km (5.274 mi). Construction commenced in 1970 and was completed in 1975.

== See also ==
- List of tunnels in Japan
- Seikan Tunnel undersea tunnel between Honshu-Hokkaido islands
- Kanmon Railway Tunnel undersea tunnel between Honshu-Kyushu islands
- Sakhalin–Hokkaido Tunnel proposed undersea tunnel between Rusia and Japan
- Bohai Strait tunnel proposed undersea tunnel in Yellow Sea, China
