= Fukushima =

Fukushima (福島, Fukushima; "Good-Fortune Island") may refer to:

== Places ==
=== Japan ===
- Fukushima Prefecture, Japanese prefecture
  - Fukushima (city), capital city of Fukushima Prefecture, Japan
    - Fukushima Station (Fukushima) in Fukushima, Fukushima
  - Fukushima Airport, airport serving northern and central Fukushima Prefecture, Japan
  - Fukushima Daiichi Nuclear Power Plant, a disabled nuclear power plant in Fukushima Prefecture, Japan
    - Fukushima Daiichi nuclear accident, 2011 nuclear accident at the Fukushima nuclear power plant, Japan
- Fukushima, Hokkaido, town in Hokkaido
- Fukushima-ku, Osaka, ward of Osaka
  - Fukushima Station (Osaka)
- Fukushima-juku, former post town in Nagano
- Fukushima, Nagasaki, former town in Nagasaki

=== Antarctica ===
- Mount Fukushima
- Fukushima Peak

== Other ==
- Fukushima (surname), a Japanese surname
- Fukushima Galilei (formerly Fukushima Industries), Japanese manufacturer of commercial refrigeration equipment
