= Shiriuchi Station =

Former railway station in Shiriuchi, Hokkaido, Japan

Coordinates: 41°36′3.8″N 140°20′5.7″E

Shiriuchi Station 知内駅
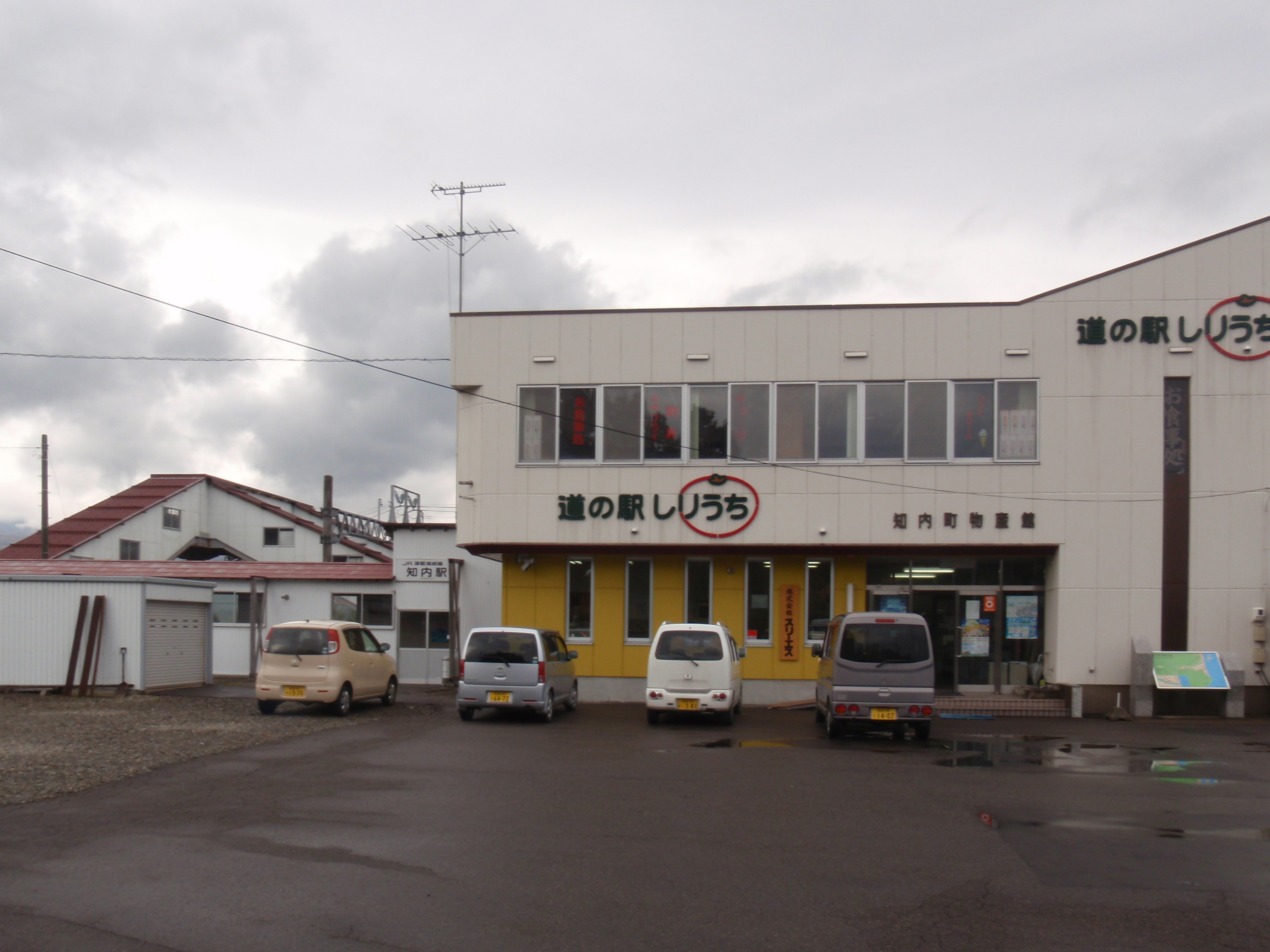
- Shiriuchi Station (left) and adjacent Shiriuchi roadside station (right) in October 2010

General information
- Location: Shiriuchi, Kamiiso District, Hokkaido; Japan
- Operator: JR Hokkaido
- Line: Kaikyo Line
- Connections: Bus stop

Other information
- Status: Closed

History
- Opened: 1990
- Closed: 14 March 2014

Former services
Preceding station	JR Hokkaido	Following station
Kikonai towards Hakodate	Tsugaru-Kaikyo Line	Yoshioka-Kaitei towards Naka-Oguni
Kikonai Terminus	Kaikyo Line	Yoshioka-Kaitei towards Naka-Oguni
Location
- Location within Japan

Shiriuchi Station (知内駅, Shiriuchi-eki) was a railway station on the Kaikyo Line in Shiriuchi, Hokkaido, Japan, operated by Hokkaido Railway Company (JR Hokkaido). Opened in 1990, it closed in March 2014. The undersea Seikan Tunnel to the main Japanese island of Honshu is not far from this station.

== Lines ==
Shiriuchi Station was served by the Kaikyo Line, which connects Honshu with the northern island of Hokkaido via the Seikan Tunnel. Only Hakuchō and Super Hakuchō limited express services stopped at this station, with just two trains in each direction stopping daily in 2013.

== Station layout ==
The station had two side platforms serving two tracks. The platforms were connected to the station entrance by a footbridge.

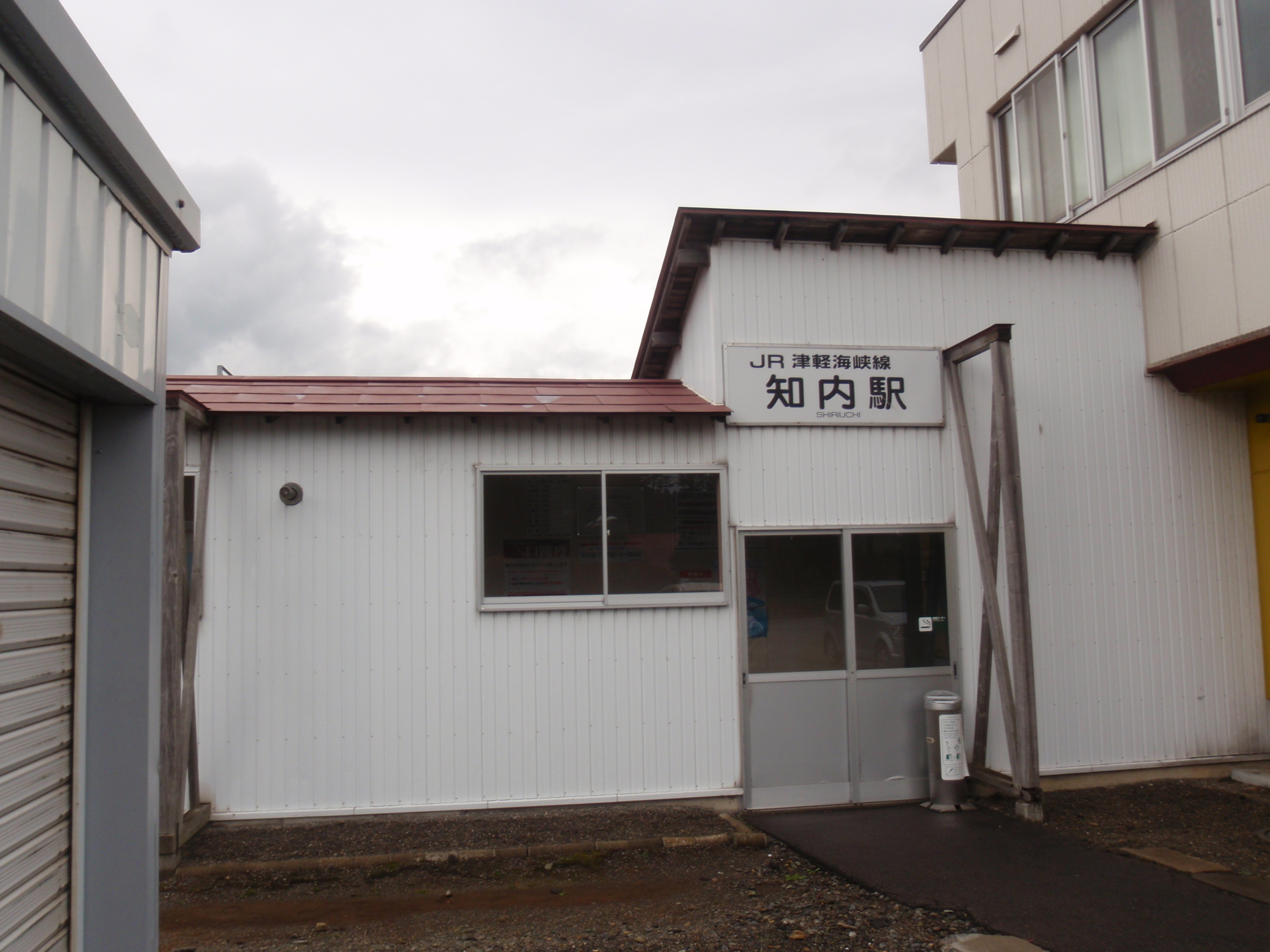
The station entrance in October 2010

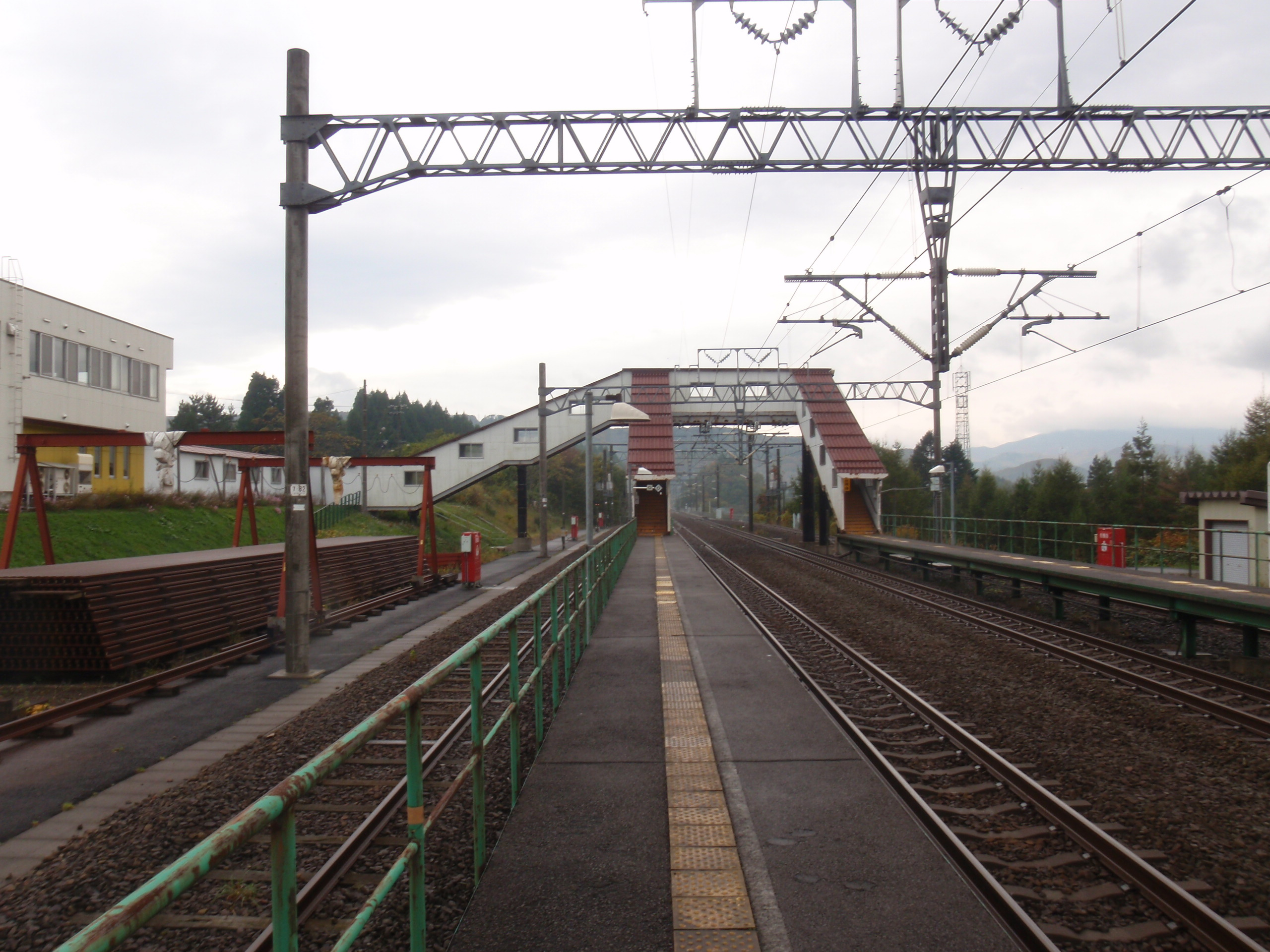
View of the platforms in October 2010

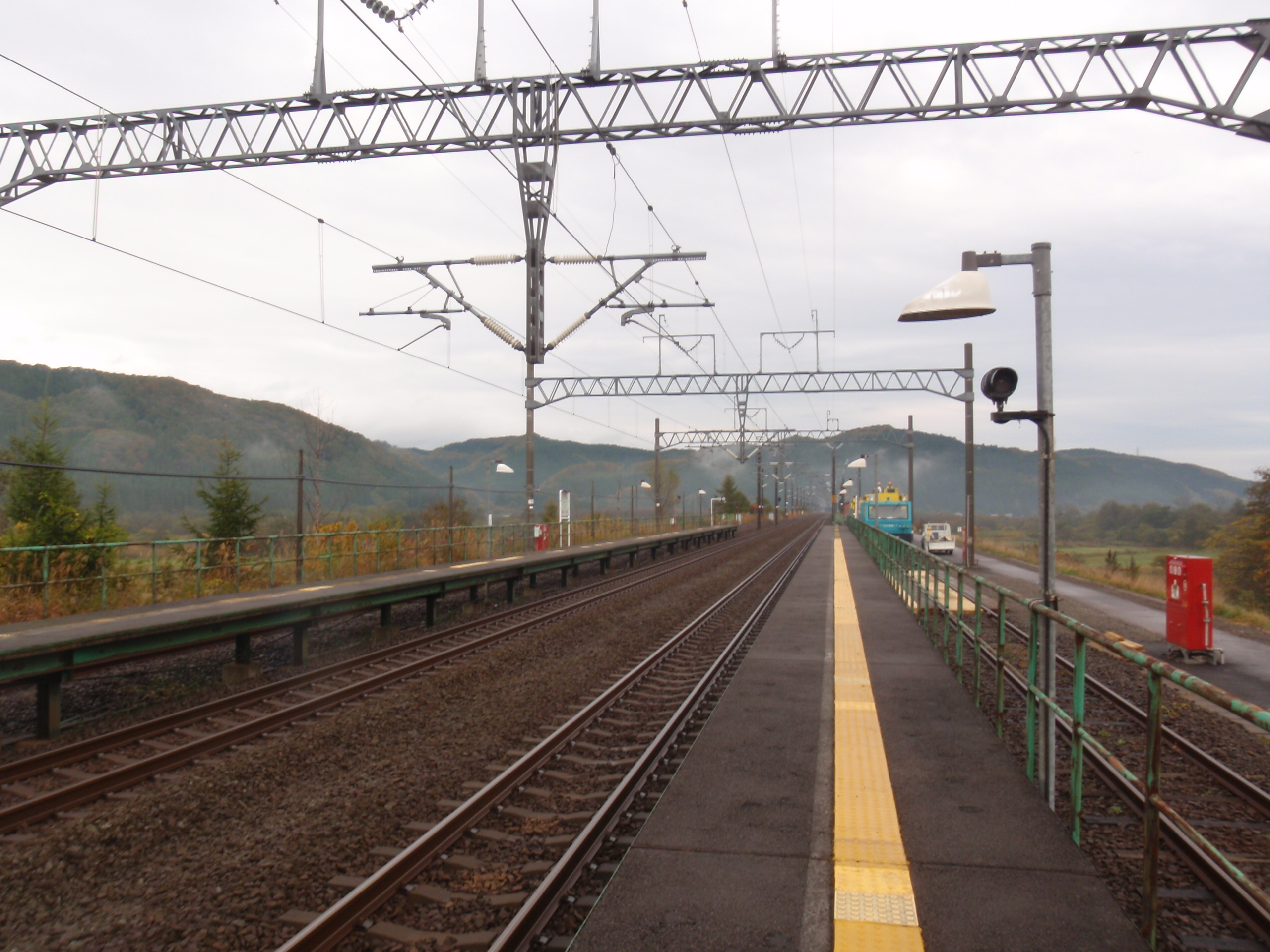
View of the platforms in October 2010

=== Platforms ===
1	■ Kaikyo Line	for Kikonai and Hakodate
2	■ Kaikyo Line	for Aomori and Shin-Aomori

== History ==
Shiriuchi Station opened in 1990. The station was closed from the start of the 15 March 2014 timetable revision to make way for Hokkaido Shinkansen construction work. Following the closure of the station, the signal located there was renamed Yunosato-Shiriuchi (湯の里知内).

== Surrounding area ==
- National Route 228
