= Shiriuchi, Hokkaido =

Shiriuchi 知内町
- Town
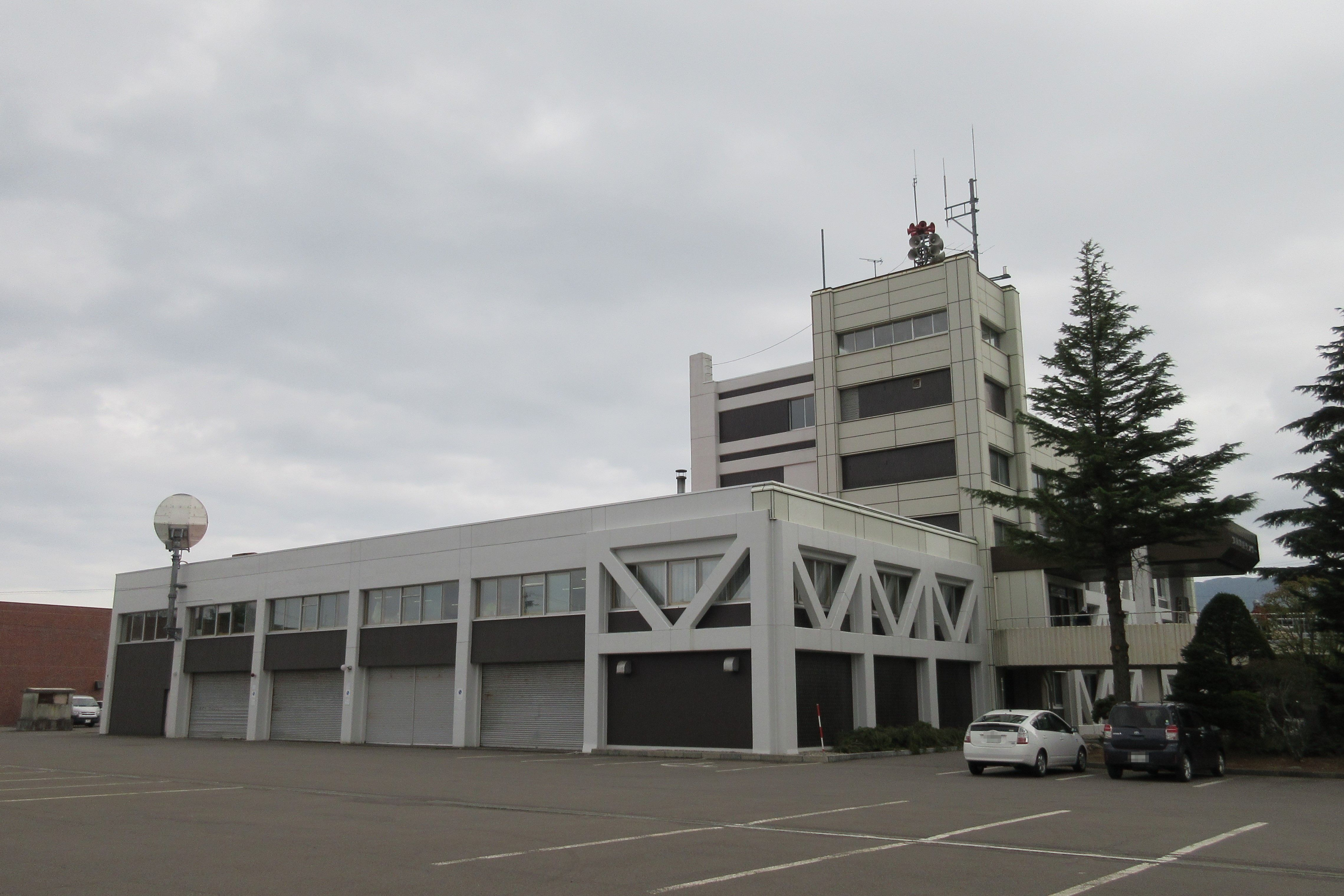
- Shiriuchi town office

- Flag Seal

- The location of Shiriuchi in Oshima Subprefecture.

- Location of Shiriuchi in Japan
- Coordinates: 41°36′N 140°25′E
- Country: Japan
- Prefecture: Hokkaido
- Subprefecture: Oshima Subprefecture
- District: Kamiiso
- Named for: Chiri Ochi A place with birds (Ainu language)

Government
  - Mayor: Takayuki Ono (大野 幸孝)

Area
  - Total: 196.67 km^{2} (75.93 sq mi)
  - Forest: 159.93 km^{2} (61.75 sq mi)

Population (2016-09-30)
  - Total: 4,620
  - Density: 23.5/km^{2} (60.8/sq mi)
- Post code: 049-1103
- Area code: 01392
- Government Office Address: Shiriuchi Yakuba, 21-1 Aza Omanai, Shiriuchi-chō, Kamiiso-gun, Hokkaidō 049-1103
- Government Office Telephone: 01392-5-6161
- Website: http://www.town.shiriuchi.hokkaido.jp/

Shiriuchi (知内町, Shiriuchi-chō) is a town located in Oshima Subprefecture, Hokkaido, Japan.

== Demographics ==
As of September 2016, the town has an estimated population of 4,620, and a density of 23 persons per km^{2}.

== Geography ==
Shiriuchi is located on the southwest of the Oshima Peninsula and faces Tsugaru Strait. Shiriuchi River flows through the town.

The total area is 196.66 km^{2}.

=== Neighboring towns ===
- Oshima Subprefecture
  - Kikonai
  - Fukushima
- Hiyama Subprefecture
  - Kaminokuni

== History ==
- 1906: Shiriuchi village was founded.
- 1967: Shiriuchi village became Shiriuchi town.

== Transportation ==
Kaikyō Line runs through the town, and the Hokkaido portal of the Seikan Tunnel is in Yunosato. There used to be Shiriuchi Station, but it closed in March 2014.

== Education ==
- High school
  - Hokkaido Shiriuchi High School

== Sister town ==
- Imabetsu, Aomori (since 1990)

== Notable people from Shiriuchi ==
- Saburō Kitajima, enka singer, lyricist and composer
