= Fuck Shit Up =

Fuck Shit Up may refer to:

== Music ==
- "Fuck Shit Up" (song), alternative title for "Mash It Up", a 2011 Karl Wolf single featuring Three 6 Mafia
- "Fuck Shit Up", a song by Dub Narcotic Sound System covered by The Jon Spencer Blues Explosion from their 1996 album Now I Got Worry

== Other uses ==
- Friends Stand United, a.k.a. FSU (originally standing for Fuck Shit Up), US national organization

== See also ==
- Fuck (disambiguation)
- Shit (disambiguation)
- Fucked up (disambiguation)
