= Fukushima, Hokkaido =

Fukushima 福島町
- Town
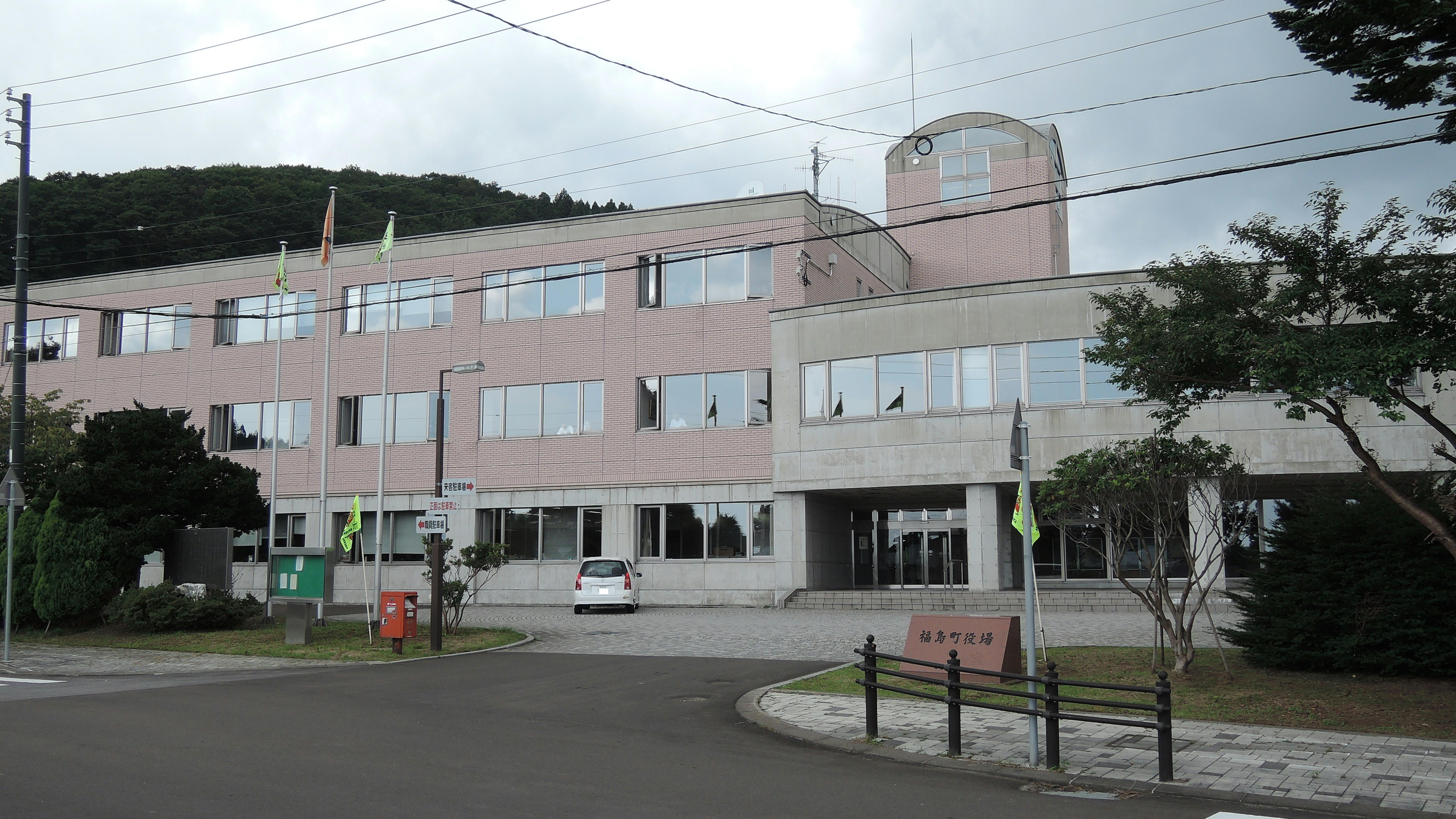
- Fukushima Town hall

- Flag Emblem

- Location of Fukushima in Hokkaido (Oshima Subprefecture)

- Location in Japan
- Coordinates: 41°28′N 140°15′E
- Country: Japan
- Region: Hokkaido
- Prefecture: Hokkaido (Oshima Subprefecture)
- District: Matsumae

Government
  - Mayor: Takuya Sato

Area
  - Total: 187.23 km^{2} (72.29 sq mi)

Population (September 30, 2016)
  - Total: 4,390
  - Density: 23.4/km^{2} (60.7/sq mi)
- Time zone: UTC+09:00 (JST)
- City hall address: 820 Fukushima, Fukushima-chō, Matsumae-gun, Hokkaidō; 049-1331
- Website: www.town.fukushima.hokkaido.jp
- Symbols
- Flower: Yamayuri (Golden-Rayed Lily)
- Tree: Sugi (Japanese Cedar)

Fukushima (福島町, Fukushima-chō) is a town located in Oshima Subprefecture, Hokkaido, Japan.

As of September 2016, the town has an estimated population of 4,390, and a density of 23 persons per km^{2}. The total area is 187.23 km^{2}.

== Economics ==
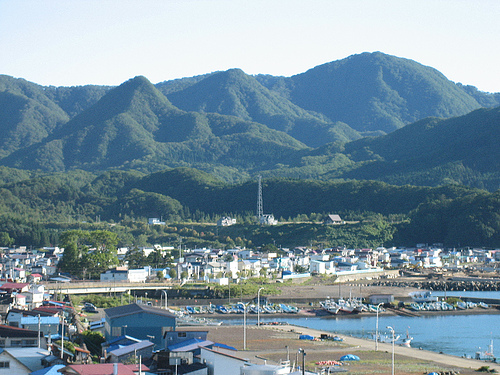
Fukushima Town port area in 2005

Industries in the town include squid fishing and tourism. The main tourist attractions are the Seikan Tunnel Museum, and the sumo museum (Yokozuna Chiyonoyama Chiyonofuji Kinenkan).

Two former Sumo Grand Champions (Yokozuna) were born and lived in Fukushima and their careers are celebrated in the sumo museum. The first is Chiyonoyama (千代の山 雅信) followed by Chiyonofuji (千代の富士貢). The latter is one of the most successful sumo wrestlers of all time and won 31 top division titles in his career before retiring in 1991.

A new tourist attraction opened in July, 2011. The Kaikyo Yokozuna Beach opened after several years of planning and building and has been named after the two famous Yokozuna from the town.

== History ==
- 1900: Fukushima village was founded.
- 1944: Fukushima village became Fukushima town.
- 1955: Fukushima town and Yoshioka village were merged to form Fukushima town.

== Transportation ==
Yoshioka, a part of the town, has access tunnels to the Seikan Tunnel and Yoshioka-Kaitei Station. This station, along with Tappi-Kaitei Station on the Aomori side of the tunnel, were the world's first undersea stations. They were closed because of the construction of Hokkaido Shinkansen.

The Seikan Tunnel travels beneath the Tsugaru Strait — connecting the island of Hokkaido and Aomori Prefecture on the Japanese island of Honshū — as part of the Japan Railways Kaikyō Line. The access tunnels from Yoshioka serve as emergency access and escape points and were important during the tunnel's construction phase.

== Education ==
- Fukushima Commercial High School (Fukushima Shougyou Koukou/福島商業高校)
- Fukushima Junior/Middle High School (福島中学校)
- Fukushima Elementary School (福島小学校) has about 100 students (first to sixth grade) and about 19 staff, including teachers. (As of Jan. 2018)

== Sister cities ==
- Kiso, Nagano
- Matsuura, Nagasaki

== Notable people ==
- Chiyonoyama Masanobu, sumo wrestler yokozuna
- Chiyonofuji Mitsugu, sumo wrestler yokozuna
