= Fucked up =

Fucked up may refer to:

- Fucked Up, a Canadian art punk band
- Fucked Up Friends, a 2008 album by American musician Tobacco
- Fucked Up Inside, a 1993 album by British band Spiritualized
- "Fucked Up" (song), a 2025 song by Macklemore

== See also ==
- Fuck Up, a 2012 Norwegian film
- Fukuppy, the former name of a mascot of Fukushima Industries, Japan
- SNAFU (Situation Normal, All Fucked Up) or FUBAR (Fucked Up Beyond All Repair), acronyms used in American military slang
