= Train on Train =

Japanese concept for train piggybacking

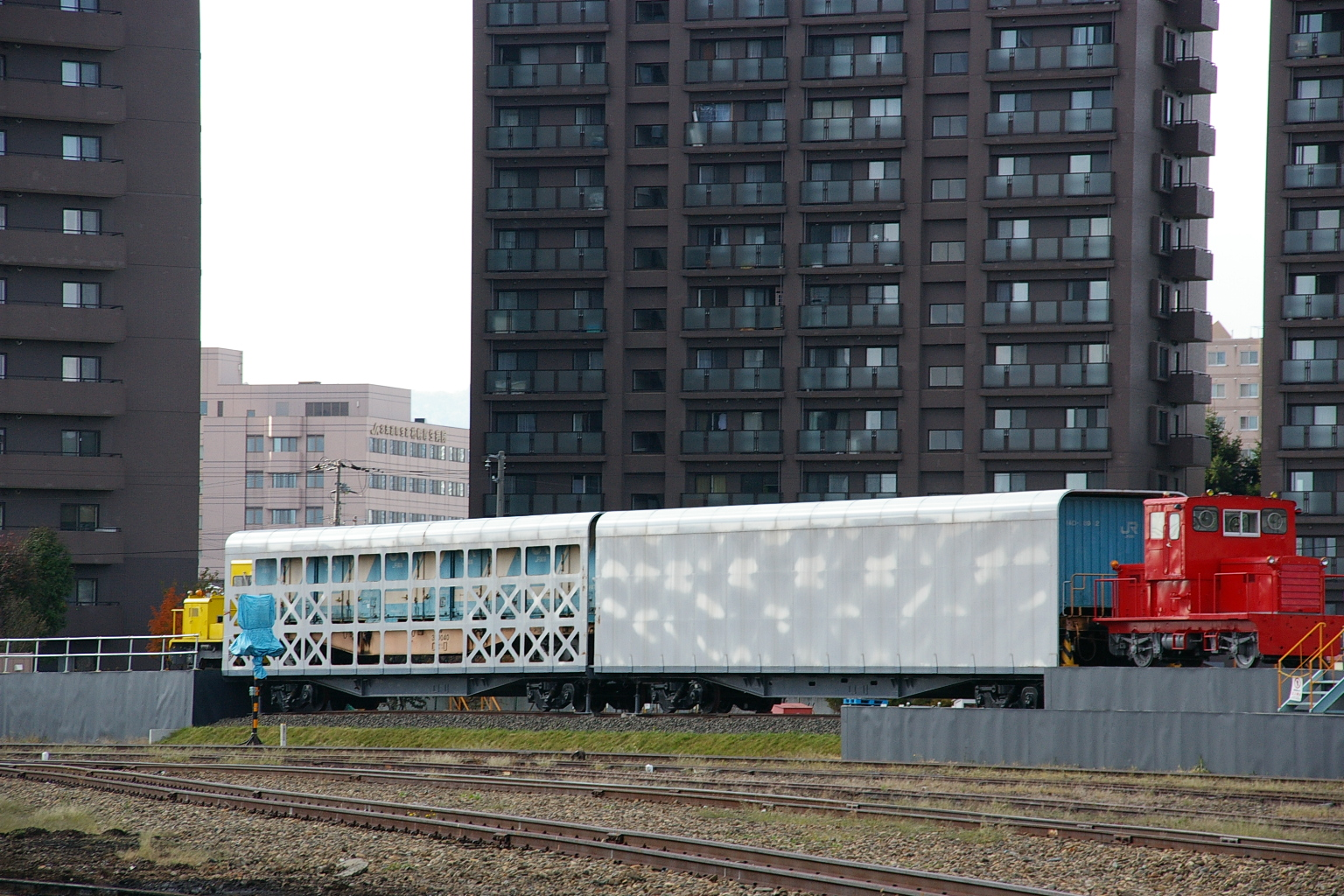
A "Train on Train" experimental mockup at Naebo Works, October 2008

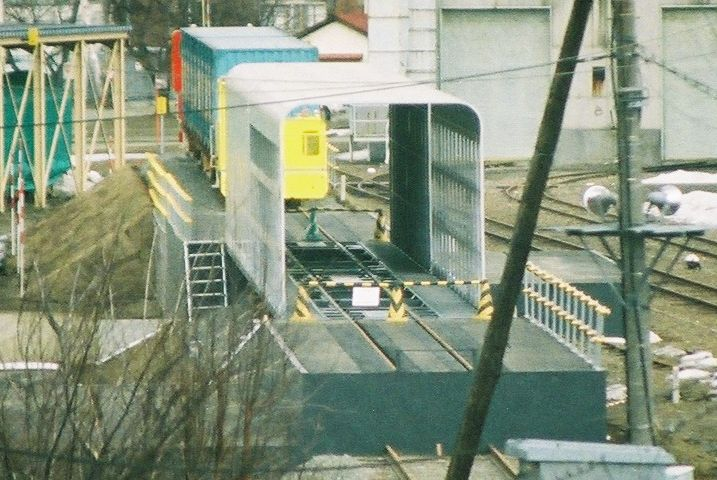
Mock-up wagons at Naebo Works, April 2007

"Train on Train" (トレイン・オン・トレイン, Torein on Torein) is a term used in Japanese rail transport. It refers to the concept of piggybacking, carrying narrow-gauge wagons on broader-gauge flat wagons. "Train on Train" uses a similar concept to Transporter wagons and Rollbocks.

The need for "Train on Train" arose when Japan's Hokkaido Railway Company (JR Hokkaido) was planning for standard-gauge Hokkaido Shinkansen high-speed trains to operate in the undersea Seikan Tunnel from 2016. The problem was that narrow-gauge freight trains did not operate at high speeds. Since the tunnel is 53.85 km (33.46 mi) long, incorporating the slower narrow-gauge trains into the timetable would significantly disrupt the planned high-speed services. It was also considered technically difficult to build new freight train shelters within the Seikan Tunnel. JR Hokkaido would investigate a solution of mounting narrow-gauge freight trains on to faster standard-gauge freight trains. JR Hokkaido applied for a patent for train-on-train on February 22, 2006, and has continued research and development to realize a Shinkansen freight train since then. The development of "Train on Train" was effectively frozen in 2015. The Hokkaido Shinkansen opened on March 26, 2016, without "Train on Train" being put into use.

== Development ==
When the Hokkaido Shinkansen opened between Shin-Aomori and Shin-Hakodate in 2016, high-speed Shinkansen trains shared the dual gauge tracks through the Seikan Tunnel which links the main island of Honshu with Hokkaido. While in the tunnel, freight trains on the narrow-gauge 1,067 mm (3 ft 6 in) rails are limited to 110 km/h (70 mph). The "Train on Train" concept involved loading narrow-gauge KoKi 100 container wagons on to specially built standard-gauge wagons to allow operation at speeds of up to 200 km/h (120 mph). The speeds in the Seikan Tunnel were reported as having been increased to 160 km/h (99 mph) after extensive testing in 2014.

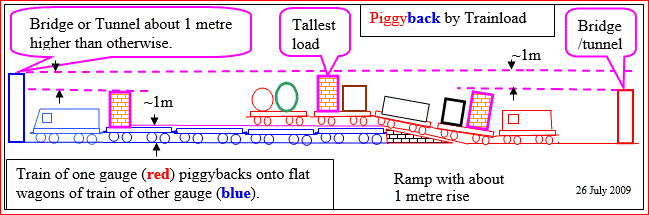
Piggyback by Trainload concept

The "Train on Train" concept was announced in 2006 and a full-size mockup vehicle was built and demonstrated at Naebo Works in 2007. While the next phase was to build a prototype train for actual operation this plan was never followed through on. beginning in 2010, JR Freight started developing a new Electric Locomotive, the Class EH800 to run on 20/25 kV AC to operate through the Seikan Tunnel. These locomotives would have hauled "Train on Train" services through the tunnel. A "Forum 2050" presentation by JR Hokkaido in 2010 stated that using a "double traverser" arrangement would allow an entire train to be transferred to and from the '"Train on Train" wagons in approximately 10 minutes. As of October 2024, the concept of "Train on Train" has not been implemented.

== See also ==
- Gauge Change Train, an experimental Japanese train designed to operate on both narrow-gauge and standard-gauge routes
- Modalohr
- Piggyback (transportation)
- Roadrailer
- Rolling highway
- Variable gauge
