= Fukuppy =

Former name of the mascot of the Fukushima Industries

The mascot, with text saying "Nice to meet you. I'm Fukuppy!"

Fukuppy (フクッピー, fukuppī; pronounced [ɸɯ̥kɯꜜppiː]) was the short-lived English name of a mascot of the Japanese company Fukushima Industries. The mascot has the form of a genderless anthropomorphic egg with red feet, little blue wings, and a happy smiling face.

Fukushima Industries (now known as Fukushima Galilei) is based in Osaka, and manufactures industrial cooling systems, particularly for the food industry. It has offices throughout Japan and in many parts of Asia, including China, Hong Kong, Malaysia, Singapore, and Taiwan.

It launched its new mascot in April 2013, to little attention. The name "Fukuppy" was a portmanteau of "Fukushima", the surname of the founder of the company, and the English word "happy". According to Fukushima Industries, Fukuppy says,

I fly around on my awesome wings, patrolling supermarket showcases and kitchen refrigerators. I can talk to vegetables, fruit, meat, and fish and can check on their health! I was born in a Fukushima refrigerator! I love eating and I'm full of curiosity. I think of myself as kind, with a strong sense of justice, but my friends say I'm a bit of a klutz. But I'm always working hard to make myself shine! I'm still an egg, so I don't know which [sex] I am! But I refer to myself as boku. (Note: Boku, a romanisation of 僕 or ぼく, is a first-person Japanese pronoun with implications of boyishness.)" (Note: As of November 2020, the Japanese original remains on Fukushima's website.)

In mid-October 2013, Fukuppy was noticed by English-speakers who spotted the inadvertent (Note: A version of the Japan Today article by Preston Phro had been published in Rocket News on 12 October 2013, and that seems to have been the first mention of Fukuppy in English.) similarity to the English word "fuckup". Fukuppy rapidly attracted publicity not only in English (including in Japan), but also in Afrikaans, Catalan, Dutch, French, German and Swedish. Some early reports wrongly associated Fukuppy with Fukushima Prefecture, or with the cleanup efforts after the 2011 Fukushima Daiichi nuclear disaster. Fukushima Industries speedily published an apology and announced that it would be withdrawing the English name of its mascot.

Fukuppy has been cited as an example of the risks associated with wasei-eigo, Japanese-language expressions based on English words that do not exist in standard English.
