= Yoshioka-Kaitei Station =

Former railway station in Fukushima, Hokkaido, Japan

Yoshioka-Kaitei Station 吉岡海底駅
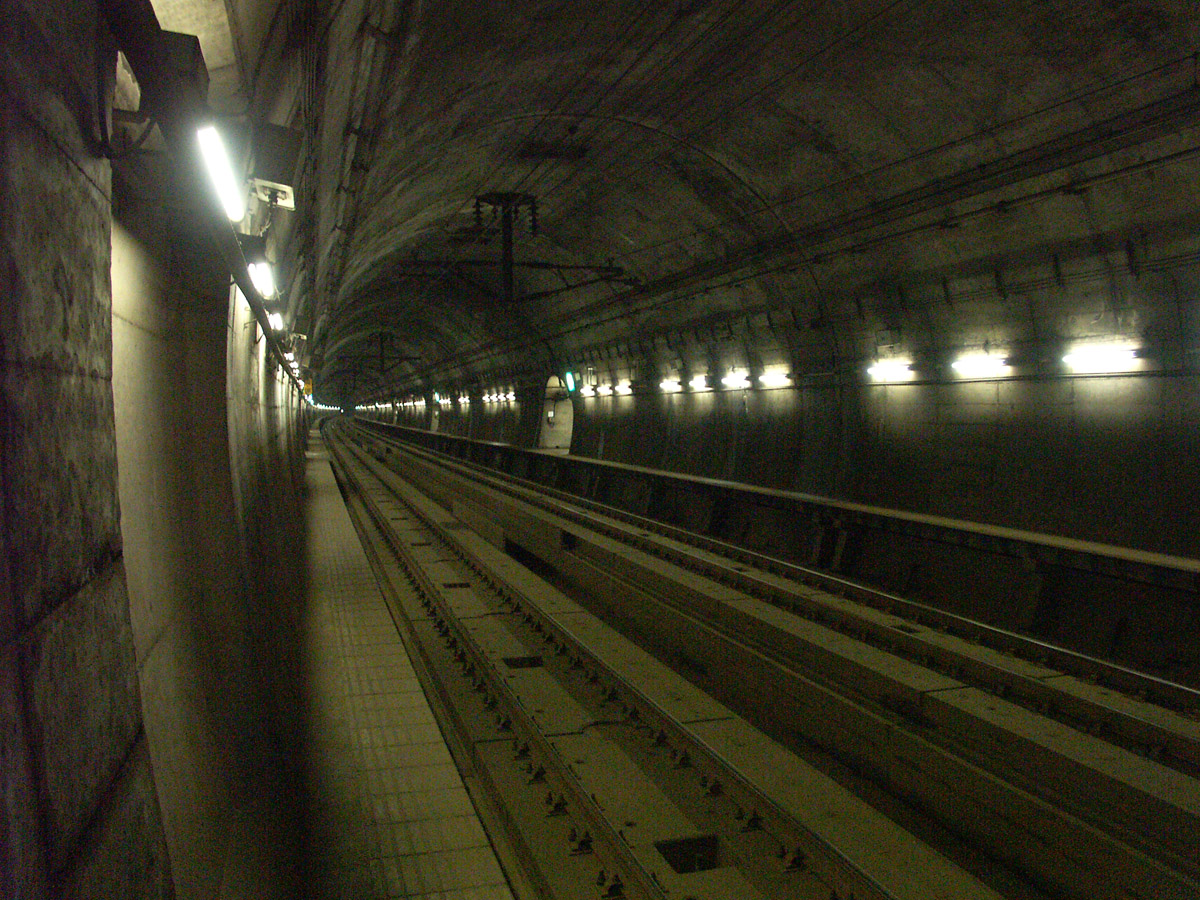
- Yoshioka-Kaitei Station platform, June 2005

General information
- Location: Fukushima, Matsumae District, Hokkaido; Japan
- Coordinates: 41°26′30″N 140°14′23″E
- Operator: JR Hokkaido
- Line: Kaikyo Line
- Platforms: 2 side platforms
- Tracks: 2

Construction
- Structure type: Underground

Other information
- Status: Closed

History
- Opened: 13 March 1988
- Closed: End of service: 17 March 2006; End of tours: 2013; Formal: 14 March 2014

Former services
Preceding station	JR Hokkaido	Following station
Shiriuchi towards Hakodate	Tsugaru-Kaikyo Line	Tappi-Kaitei towards Naka-Oguni
Shiriuchi towards Kikonai	Kaikyo Line	Tappi-Kaitei towards Naka-Oguni
Location
- Location within Hokkaido Location within Japan

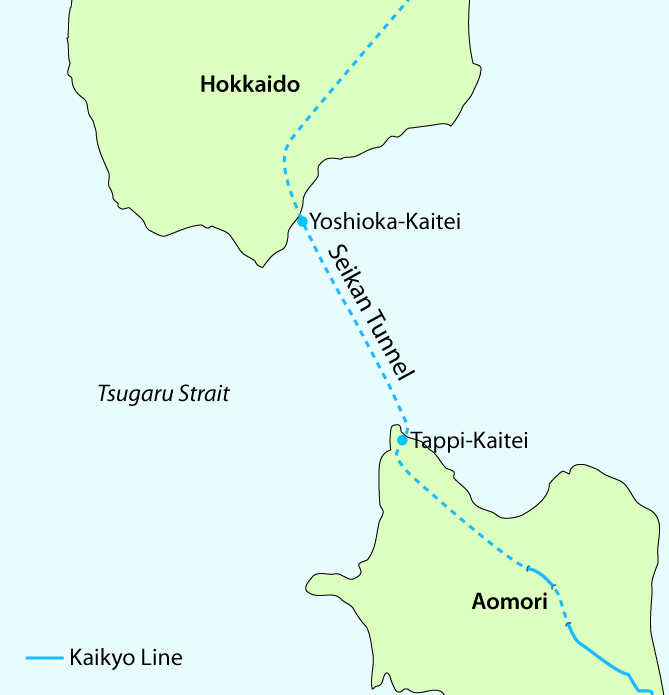
Map showing the Seikan Tunnel and the two underground stations

Yoshioka-Kaitei Station (Japanese: 吉岡海底駅, Hepburn: Yoshioka-Kaitei-eki) was a railway station on the Kaikyo Line in Fukushima, Hokkaido, Japan, operated by Hokkaido Railway Company (JR Hokkaido). The station was underground and was located within the Seikan Tunnel under the Tsugaru Strait linking the main Japanese island of Honshu with the northern island of Hokkaido. The station was located 149.5 metres (490 ft) below sea level, making it the deepest underground station in the world.

== Overview ==
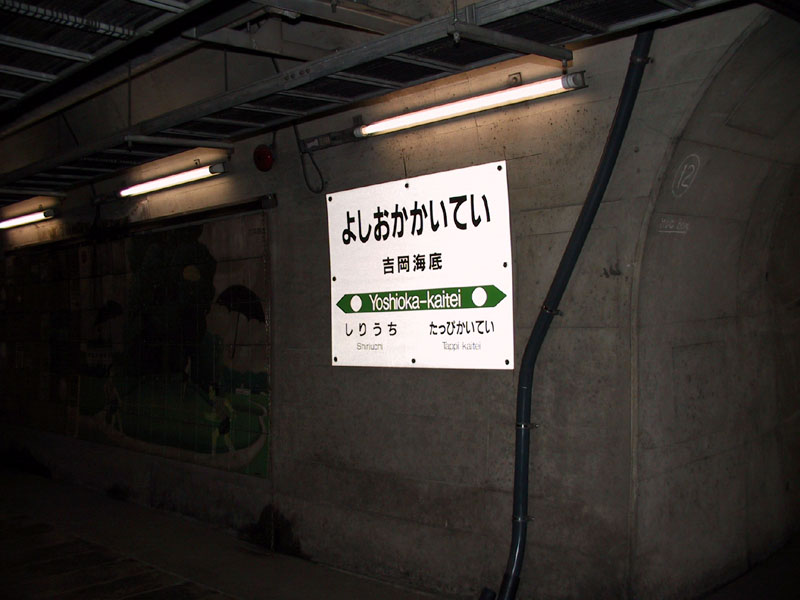
Platform sign of Yoshioka-Kaitei Station

One of two stations located within the Seikan Tunnel, along with Tappi-Kaitei Station, it served as an emergency escape point, and this role has not changed after its closure as a passenger station. By segmenting the undersea tunnel, in the event of a fire or other disaster, the stations provide safety equivalent to that of a much shorter tunnel. The effectiveness of the escape shafts located at the emergency stations is enhanced by exhaust fans that suck up smoke, television cameras to route passengers to safety, thermal (infrared) fire alarm systems, and water spray nozzles.

Previously, the station contained a museum detailing the history and function of the tunnel and could be visited on special sightseeing tours. However, while Tappi-Kaitei remained as a museum until 2013, Yoshioka-Kaitei was closed to regular services on 17 March 2006 to make way for Hokkaido Shinkansen preparations.

A special 781 series Doraemon-themed train then started running on 15 July 2006 to the station, which staged a "Nobita's room" (のび太の部屋, Nobita no heya) exhibition. This service continued until 27 August 2006, when the station was shut down and used as storage space for Hokkaido Shinkansen building materials.

== History ==
The station opened on 13 March 1988, along with the Kaikyo Line. From 17 March 2006, regular services stopped calling at this station to make way for Hokkaido Shinkansen construction work, and on 27 August 2006, the special Doraemon-themed train also made its final stop at the station.

The station formally closed as of the end of 14 March 2014.

== See also ==
- List of railway stations in Japan
- Arsenalna (Kyiv Metro), the deepest urban rapid transit station in the world
- Jerusalem-Yitzhak Navon railway station, the current deepest heavy rail station in the world
