= Seikan Tunnel Tappi Shakō Line =

Japanese funicular line

Coordinates: 41°15′14.5″N 140°20′49.5″E

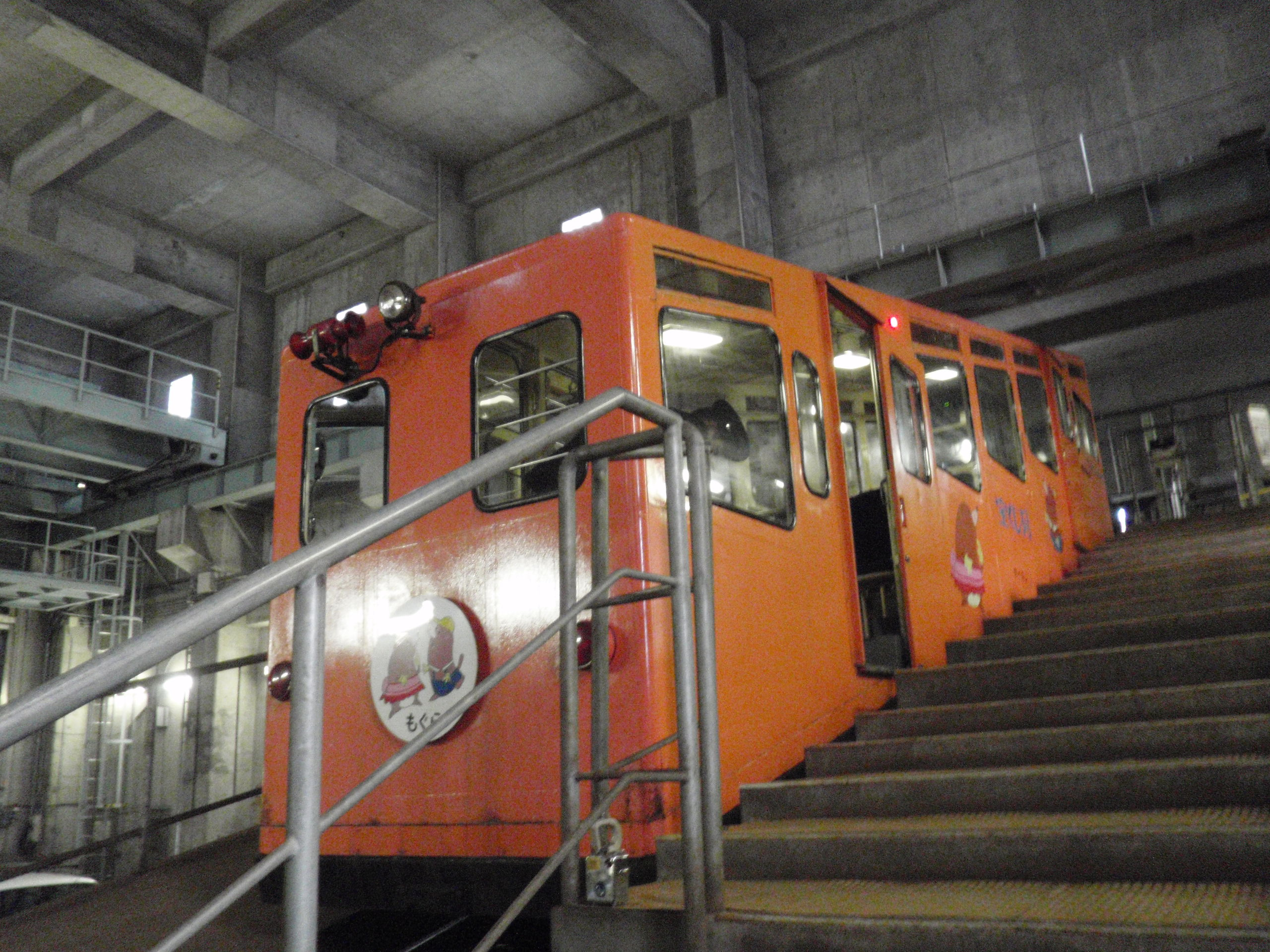
Mogura-gō at Seikan Tunnel Museum Station

The Seikan Tunnel Tappi Shakō Line (青函トンネル竜飛斜坑線, Seikan Tonneru Tappi Shakō-sen; "Seikan Tunnel Tappi Inclined Tunnel Line") is a Japanese funicular railway (often referred to as a "cable car" in Japan) in Sotogahama, Aomori Prefecture, operated by the Seikan Tunnel Museum.

The 3 ft (914 mm) narrow-gauge line descends from the Seikan Tunnel Memorial Hall, near Cape Tappi, into the underground Tappi-Kaitei Station on the Seikan Tunnel, which is one of the longest railway tunnels in the world (which opened in March 1988), second to the Gotthard Base Tunnel in Switzerland that opened in June 2016.

The funicular was originally installed to transport workers and goods during construction of the Seikan Tunnel but is now an attraction at the Seikan Tunnel Museum.

== Basic data ==
- Distance: 0.8 kilometers (0.50 mi)
- System: Single-track with single car, balanced with a weight
- Gauge: 3 ft (914 mm)
- Elevation: 778 m (2,552 ft)
- Gradient: 19 degrees

== See also ==
- Kaikyō Line
- List of funicular railways
- List of railway companies in Japan
- List of railway lines in Japan
- Seikan Tunnel
