= JR Freight Class EH800 =

Japanese electric locomotive type

Class EH800
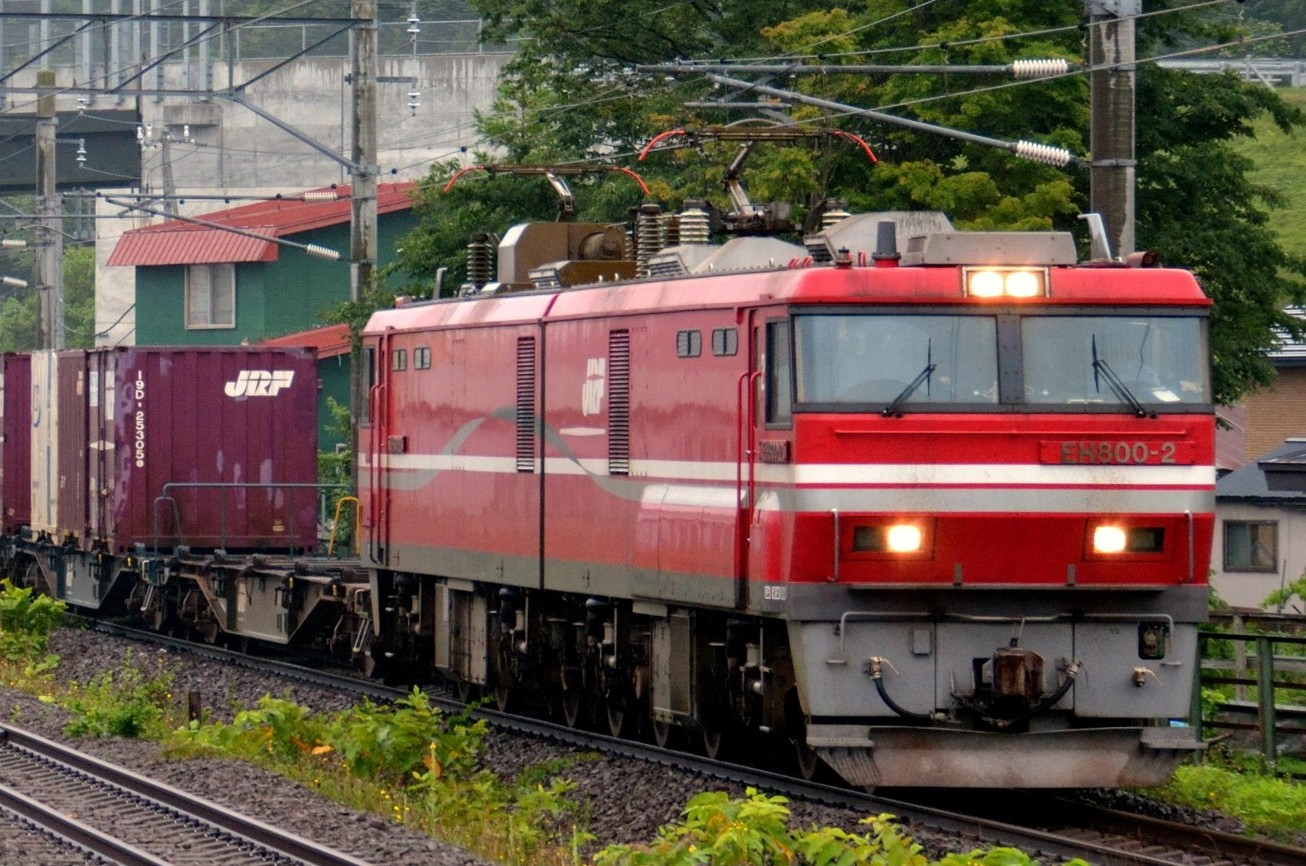
- EH800-2 in service in July 2016
Type and origin
- Power type: Electric
- Builder: Toshiba
- Build date: 2012–
Specifications
- Configuration
  - UIC: Bo′Bo′+Bo′Bo′
- Gauge: 1,067 mm (3 ft 6 in)
- Bogies: FD7
- Wheel diameter: 1,120 mm (44 in)
- Length: 25,000 mm (82 ft 0 in)
- Width: 2,808 mm (9 ft 3 in)
- Loco weight: 134.4 t
- Electric system/s: 20/25 kV AC, 50 Hz
- Loco brake: Air and electrical regenerative
- Train brakes: Air
- Safety systems: ATS-SF, ATC-L (DS-ATC)
Performance figures
- Maximum speed: 110 km/h (70 mph)
- Power output: 4 MW (5,400 hp) at 25 kV; 3.04 MW (4,080 hp) at 20 kV
- Tractive effort
  - Starting: 411.6 kN (92,500 lb_{f})
  - Continuous: 240.5 kN (54,100 lb_{f})
Career
- Operators: JR Freight
- Number in class: 20 (as of 1 March 2017)
- Delivered: January 2013
- First run: July 2014

The Class EH800 (EH800形) is a Bo′Bo′+Bo′Bo′ wheel arrangement multi-voltage AC two-unit electric locomotive type operated by Japan Freight Railway Company (JR Freight) in Japan hauling freight trains on the Kaikyō Line through the Seikan Tunnel separating mainland Honshu with the northern island of Hokkaido. A prototype locomotive was delivered in January 2013 for evaluation and testing, with full-production locomotives delivered from June 2014, entering service from July 2014.

== Background ==
In order to allow Hokkaido Shinkansen services to operate through the dual-gauge Seikan Tunnel (which commenced on 26 March 2016), the overhead line system voltage was raised from the narrow gauge standard of 20 kV AC to the standard shinkansen power supply of 25 kV AC. A fleet of approximately 20 new dual-voltage locomotives capable of operating under either 20 kV or 25 kV was therefore required to replace the Class ED79 and Class EH500 locomotives previously used to haul freight and overnight sleeping car services through the tunnel. These locomotives are also compatible with the digital ATC and feature digital train wireless communications. The total cost of manufacturing the fleet of locomotives together with construction of new maintenance depot facilities was approximately 19 billion yen. This kind of electric locomotive is modelled on the EH500, which was also manufactured by Toshiba, and therefore has a similar appearance and structure.

== Design ==
The Bo′Bo′+Bo′Bo′ wheel arrangement locomotives are painted in an all-over red livery with a white bodyside line and silver wavy line.

== Operations ==
The locomotives operate between Higashi-Aomori Freight Terminal and Goryōkaku Freight Terminal via the Kaikyō Line and Seikan Tunnel.

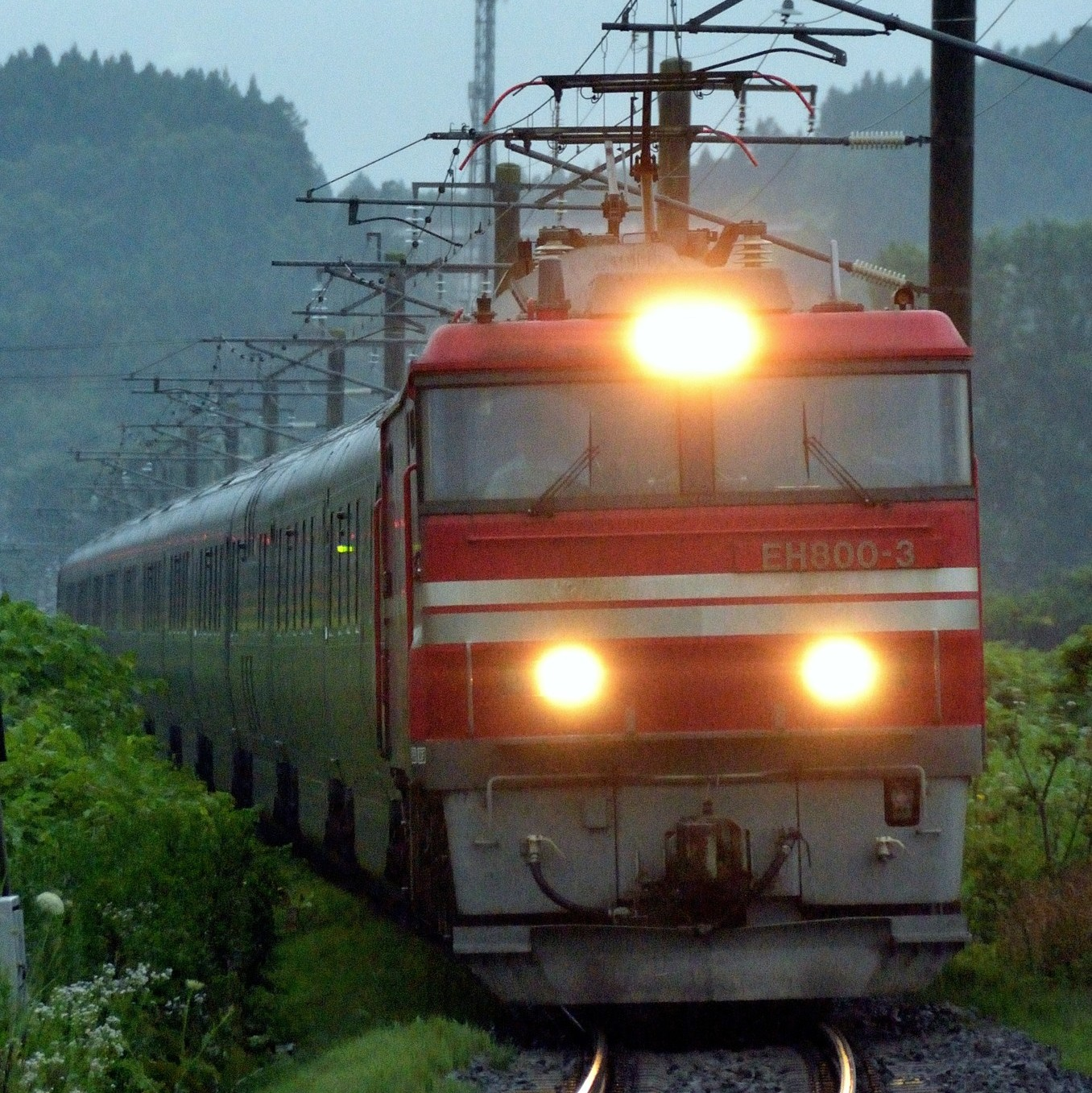
EH800-3 hauling a Cassiopeia cruise train in July 2016

== History ==
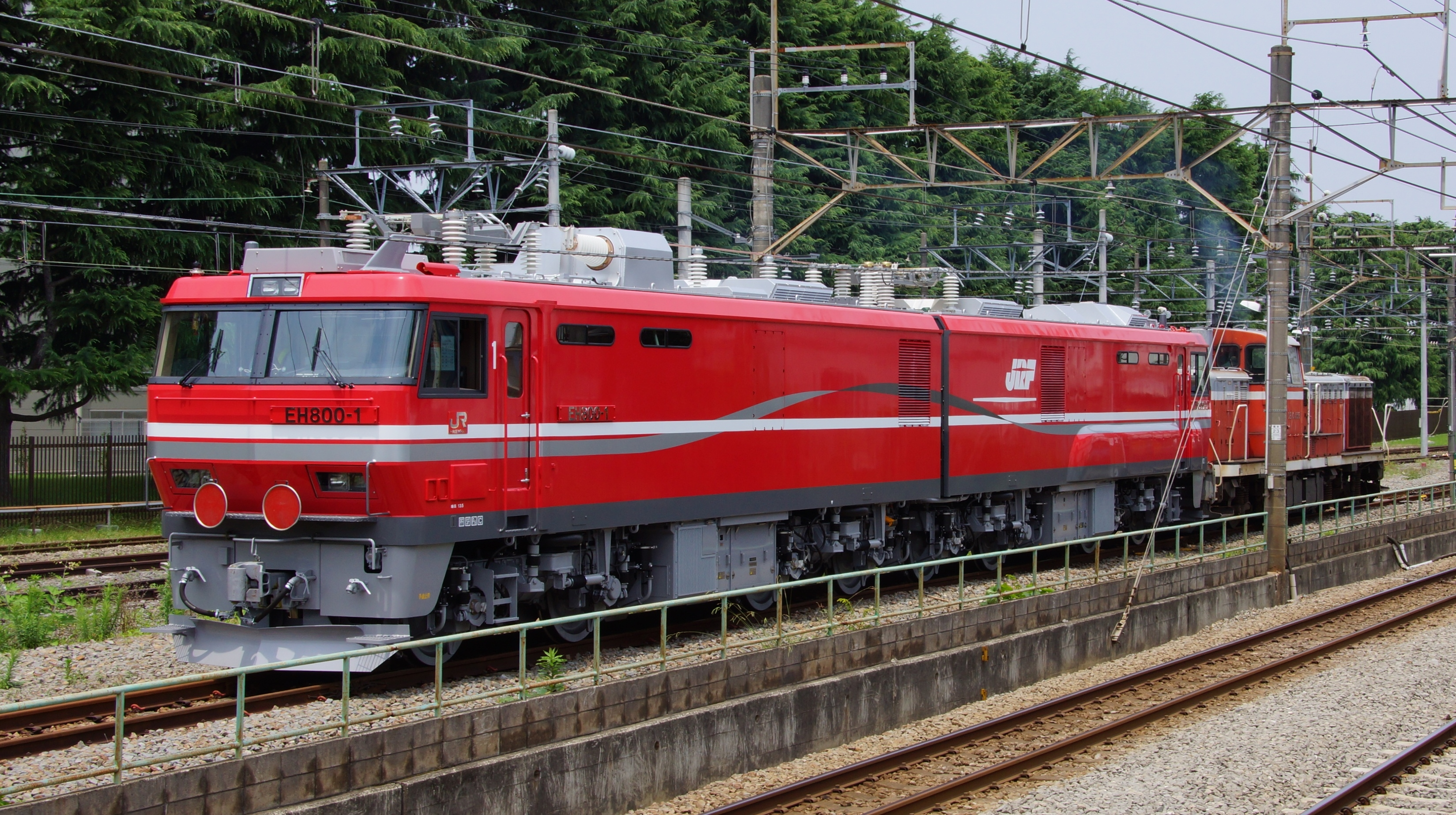
The first full-production locomotive, EH800-1, on delivery in June 2014

Design of the prototype locomotive, EH800-901, began in fiscal 2010, and the completed locomotive was unveiled to the press at the Toshiba factory in Fuchū, Tokyo, on 27 November 2012. It was delivered to JR Freight in Sendai in January 2013. Following delivery, the prototype locomotive was tested within the confines of Higashi-Fukushima Station before being moved to Goryōkaku Depot in Hokkaido for testing in winter conditions.

The first full-production locomotive was delivered in June 2014. This entered revenue service on 16 July 2014.

Major overhauls of this train are carried out by the Omiya Comprehensive Vehicle Centre, and traction duties in the DC line area are usually carried out by Class EF210 or Class EF65.

== Fleet list ==
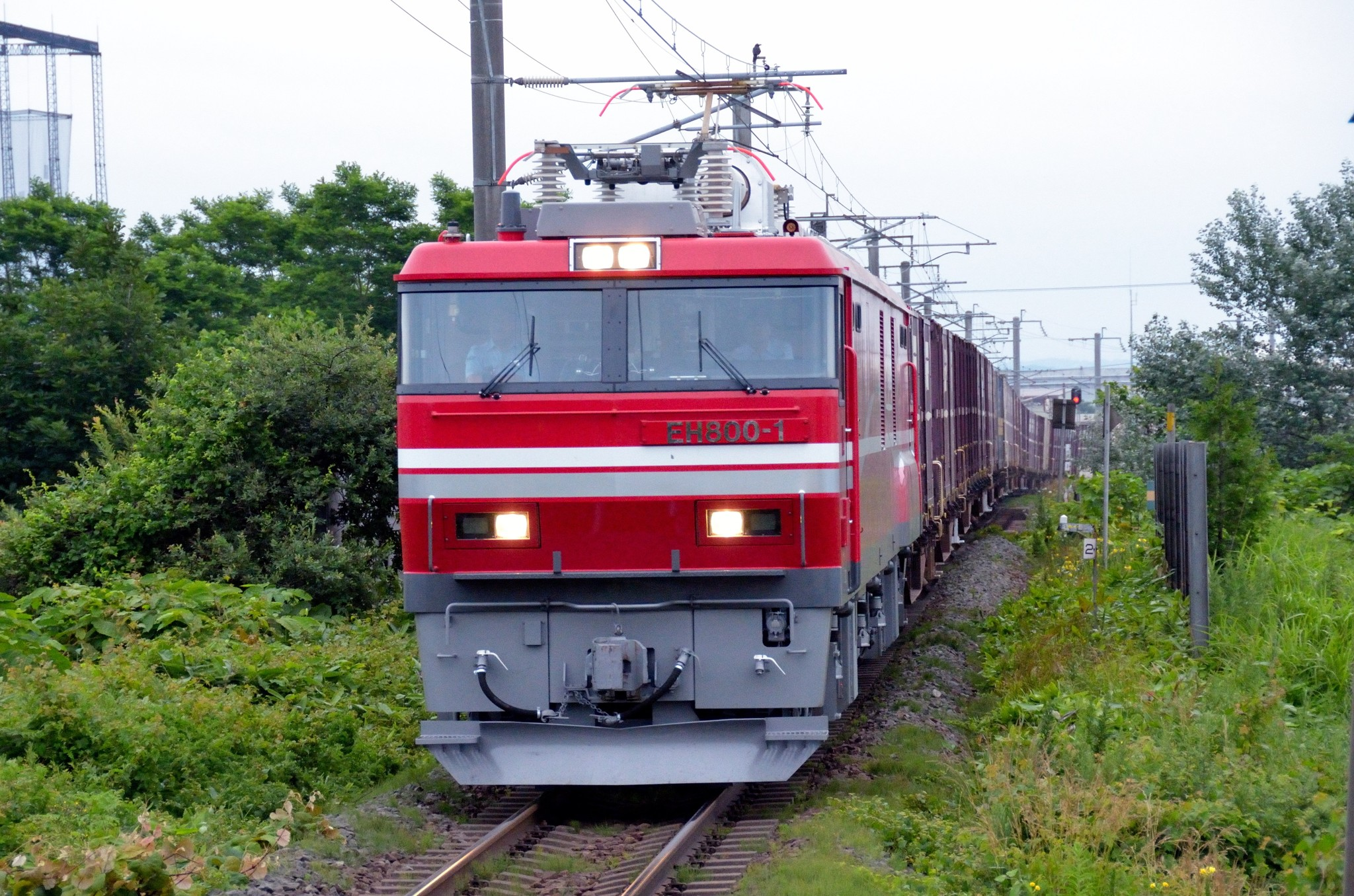
EH800-1 in service in July 2014

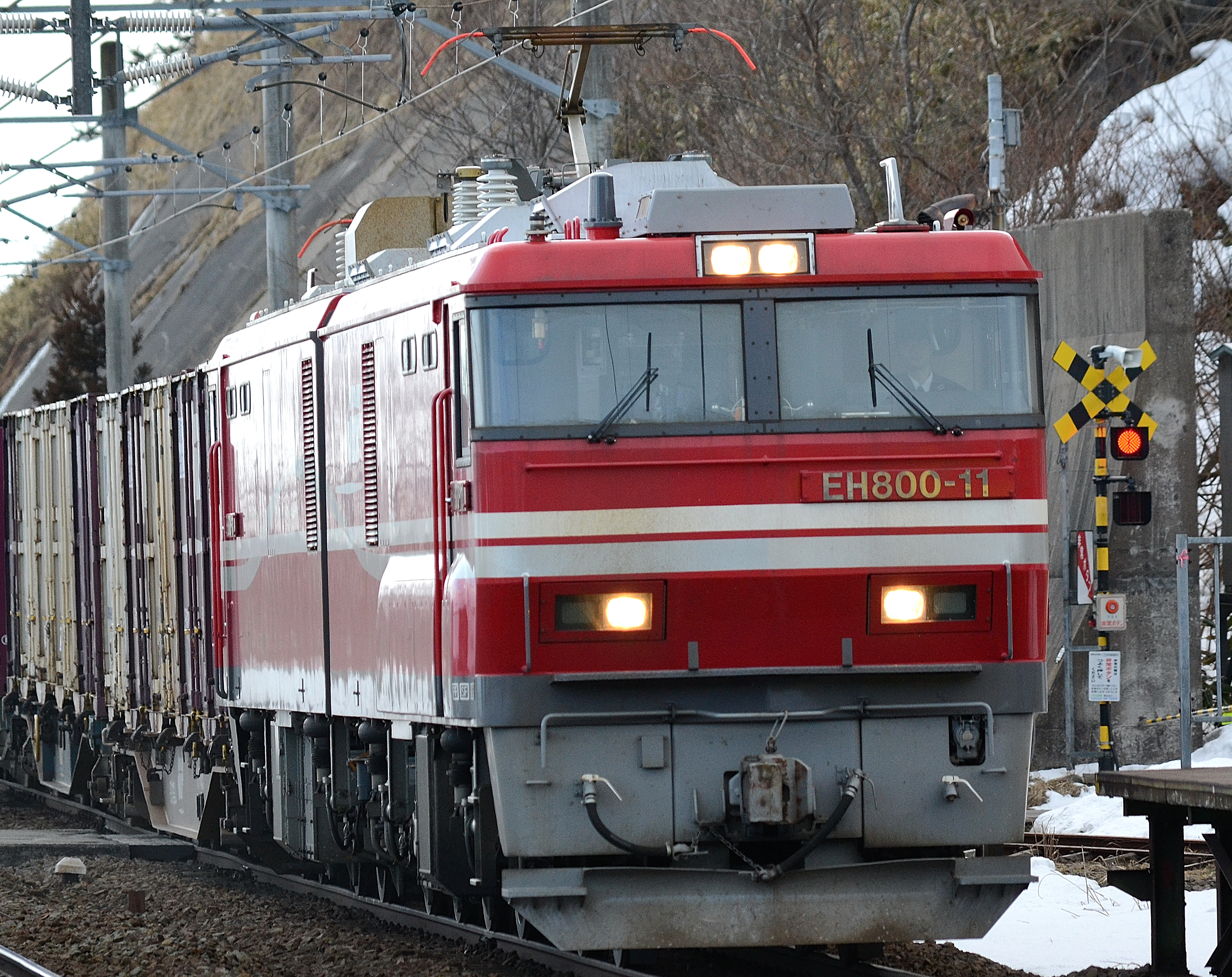
EH800-11 in service in March 2016

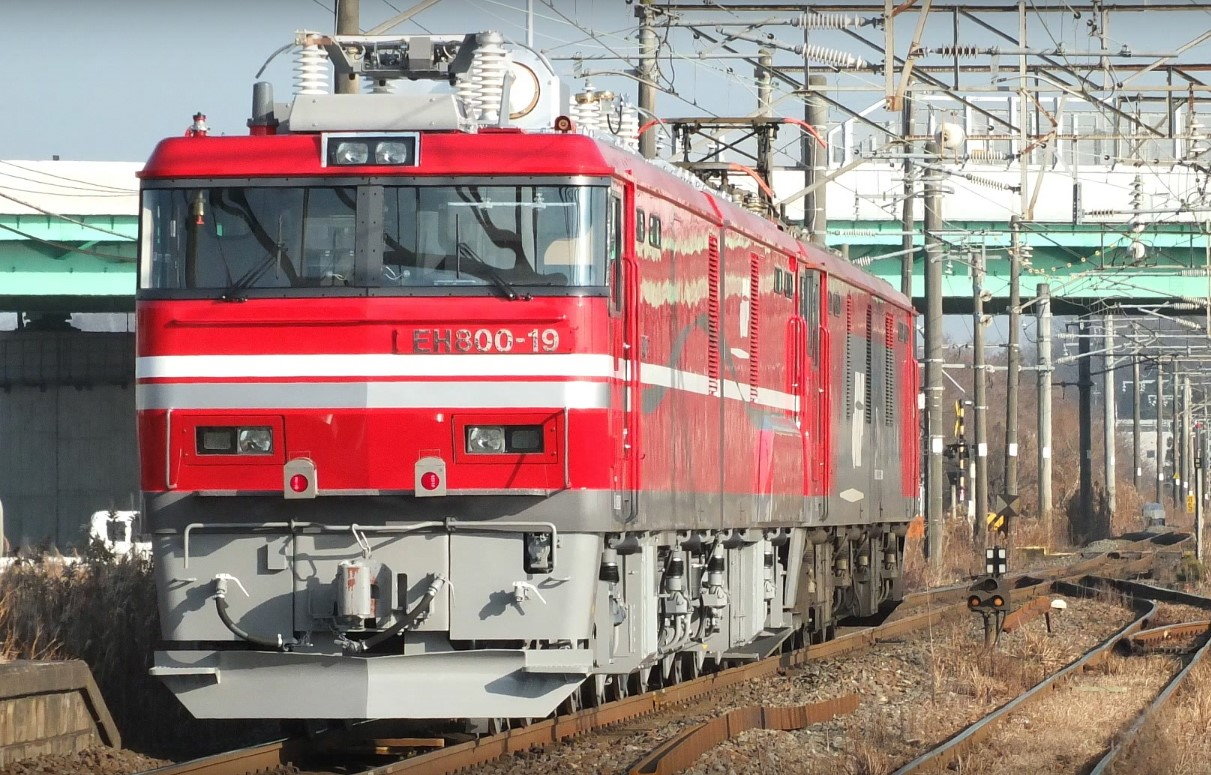
EH800-19 being delivered in December 2016

As of 1 March 2017, 20 Class EH800 locomotives are in service.

Number	Manufacturer	Date delivered	Remarks
EH800-901	Toshiba	January 2013	Prototype
EH800-1	Toshiba	June 2014	Full-production locomotives
EH800-2	Toshiba	July 2014	Full-production locomotives
EH800-3	Toshiba	August 2014	Full-production locomotives
EH800-4	Toshiba	September 2014	Full-production locomotives
EH800-5	Toshiba	October 2014	Full-production locomotives
EH800-6	Toshiba	December 2014	Full-production locomotives
EH800-7	Toshiba	February 2015	Full-production locomotives
EH800-8	Toshiba	February 2015	Full-production locomotives
EH800-9	Toshiba	April 2015	Full-production locomotives
EH800-10	Toshiba	May 2015	Full-production locomotives
EH800-11	Toshiba	June 2015	Full-production locomotives
EH800-12	Toshiba	July 2015	Full-production locomotives
EH800-13	Toshiba	September 2015	Full-production locomotives
EH800-14	Toshiba	November 2015	Full-production locomotives
EH800-15	Toshiba	January 2016	Full-production locomotives
EH800-16	Toshiba	February 2016	Full-production locomotives
EH800-17	Toshiba	September 2016	Full-production locomotives
EH800-18	Toshiba	October 2016	Full-production locomotives
EH800-19	Toshiba	December 2016	Full-production locomotives

== Classification ==
The EH800 classification for this locomotive type is explained below. As with previous locomotive designs, the prototype is numbered EH800-901, with subsequent production locomotives numbered from EH800-1 onward.

- E: Electric locomotive
- H: Eight driving axles
- 800: AC locomotive with AC motors

== See also ==
- Train on Train, a piggy-back concept for transporting freight through the Seikan Tunnel at higher speeds
