= Fukushima Galilei =

Japanese manufacturer

Fukushima Galilei headquarters in 2021.

Fukushima Galilei (until 2019, Fukushima Industries) is a Japanese manufacturer of commercial refrigeration equipment; particularly for the food industry, but since 1999 also for medical applications. It was founded in 1951 by Nobuo Fukushima in Osaka, where as of 2020 it is still based. In 1994, it went public; and since 2002, it has been listed on the Tokyo Stock Exchange. It has offices throughout Japan and also in many parts of Asia, including China, Hong Kong, Malaysia, Singapore and Taiwan.

In 2013, it gained brief notoriety outside its usual areas of operation when it introduced as corporate mascot a cartoon anthropomorphic egg with the name Fukuppy, a name which it quickly withdrew.
