= Hakuchō (train) =

Japanese limited express train service

Hakuchō Super Hakuchō
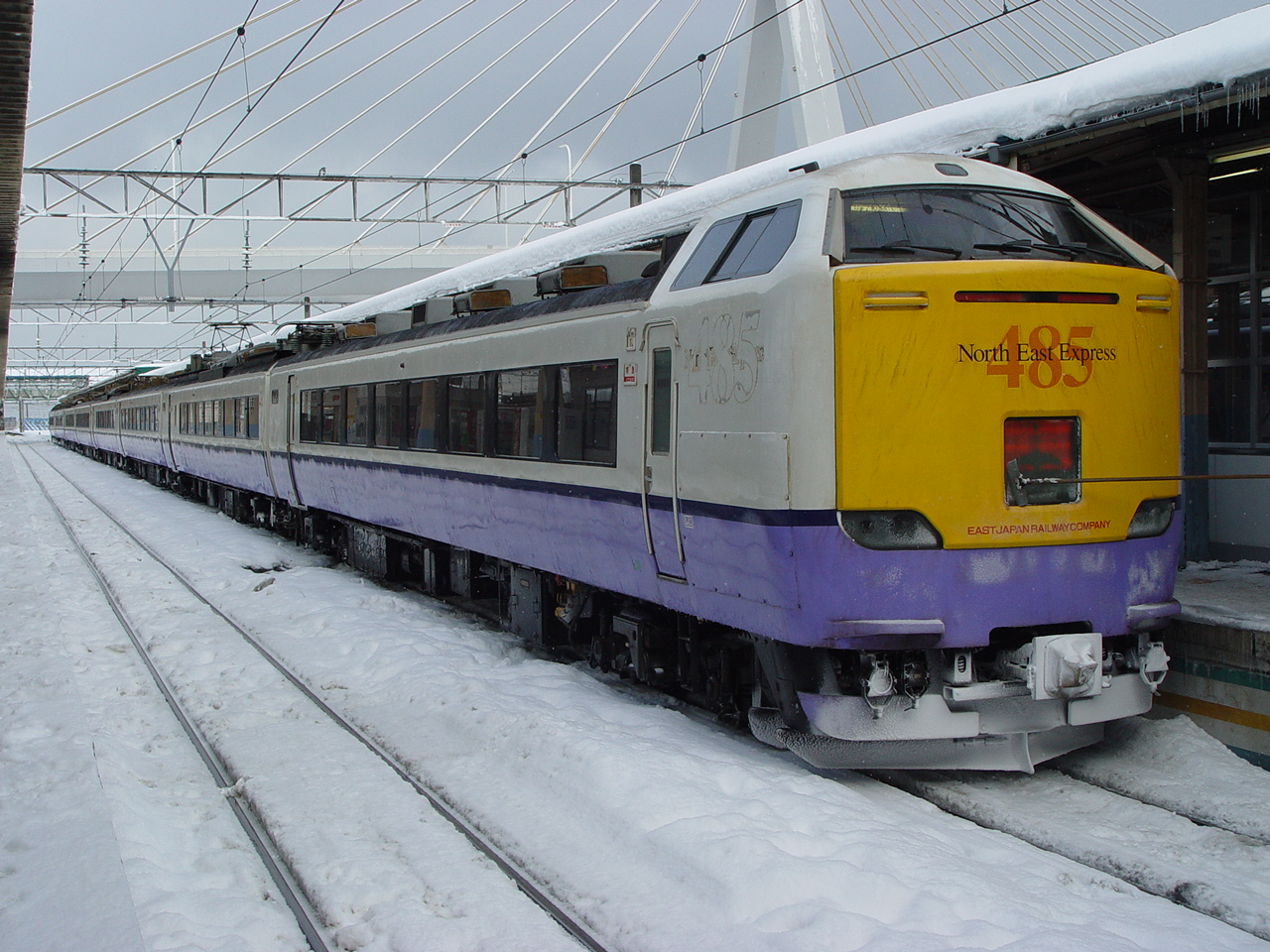
- A 485-3000 series EMU on a Hakuchō service at Aomori Station in January 2003

Overview
- Service type: Limited express
- Status: Discontinued
- Locale: Japan
- First service: 1960 (Semi express); 1961 (Limited express)
- Last service: March 2016
- Successor: Hokkaido Shinkansen services
- Former operator(s): JNR, JR East, JR Hokkaido

Route
- Termini: Shin-Aomori; Hakodate
- Distance travelled: 164.3 km (102.1 mi)
- Line(s) used: Tsugaru-Kaikyō Line

On-board services
- Class(es): Green + standard
- Seating arrangements: 2+2
- Catering facilities: Trolley service

Technical
- Rolling stock: 485-3000 series (Hakuchō); 789 series/785 series (Super Hakuchō) EMUs
- Track gauge: 1,067 mm (3 ft 6 in)
- Electrification: 20 kV AC, 50 Hz
- Operating speed: 140 km/h (87 mph)

The Hakuchō (白鳥, Hakuchō) and Super Hakuchō (スーパー白鳥) were Japanese limited express train services which operated between Shin-Aomori and Hakodate via the undersea Seikan Tunnel from December 2002 until March 2016. The services were operated by East Japan Railway Company (JR East) and Hokkaido Railway Company (JR Hokkaido) respectively.

== Hakuchō ==
The Hakuchō services operated between Shin-Aomori and Hakodate using refurbished JR East 485-3000 series six-car EMUs, extended to eight cars during busy seasons. Services operated at a maximum speed of 140 km/h (85 mph) on the ATC-controlled section of the Seikan Tunnel, with the fastest services between Shin-Aomori and Hakodate taking 2 hours 8 minutes.

The Hakuchō name actually dated back to 1960, as the name of a service which ran from Osaka to Aomori until March 2001. The name was reused for the new services starting in 2002 by popular demand.

== Super Hakuchō ==
The Super Hakuchō services operated between Shin-Aomori and Hakodate using JR Hokkaido 789 series six- and eight-car EMUs and a converted 785-300 series 2-car EMU set. As with the Hakuchō services, these trains operated at a maximum speed of 140 km/h (85 mph) on the ATC-controlled section of the Seikan Tunnel, with the fastest services between Shin-Aomori and Hakodate taking 2 hours 1 minute.

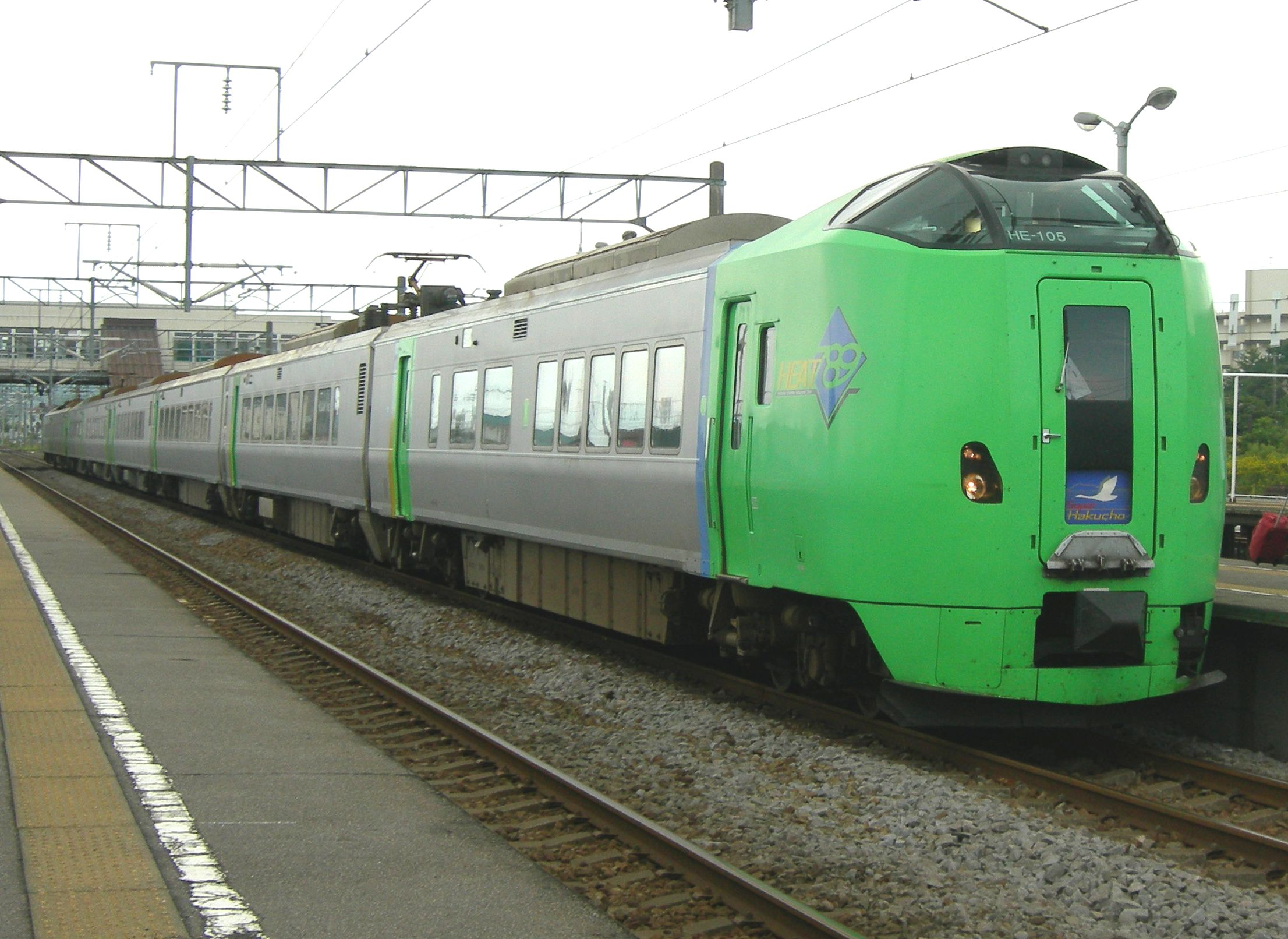
A JR Hokkaido 789 series EMU on a Super Hakuchō service in August 2010

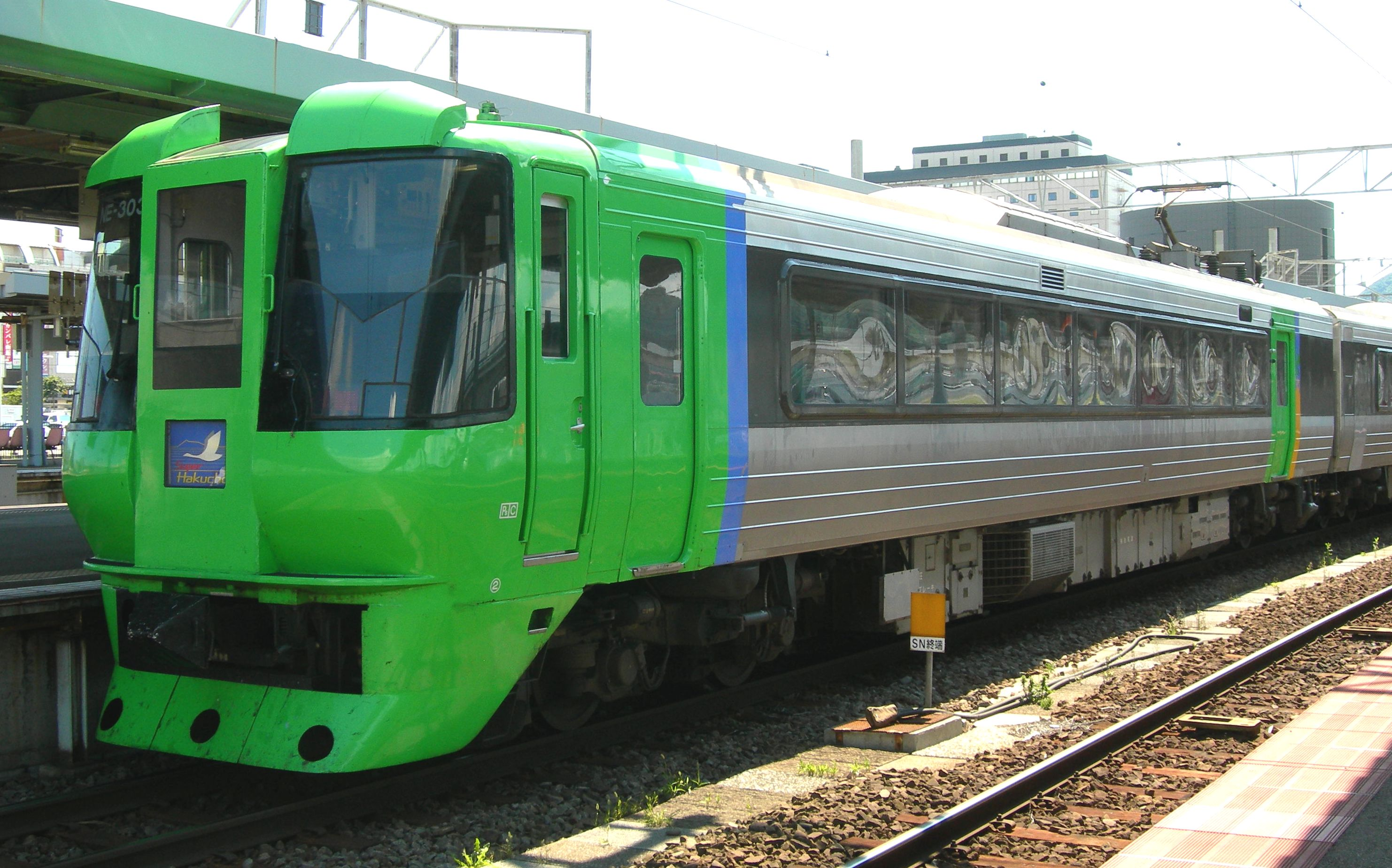
A converted 785-300 series EMU on a Super Hakuchō service in August 2011

== History ==
=== Semi express ===
The Hakuchō service was first introduced from 28 December 1960, as a semi express service operating between Akita and Same via Aomori.

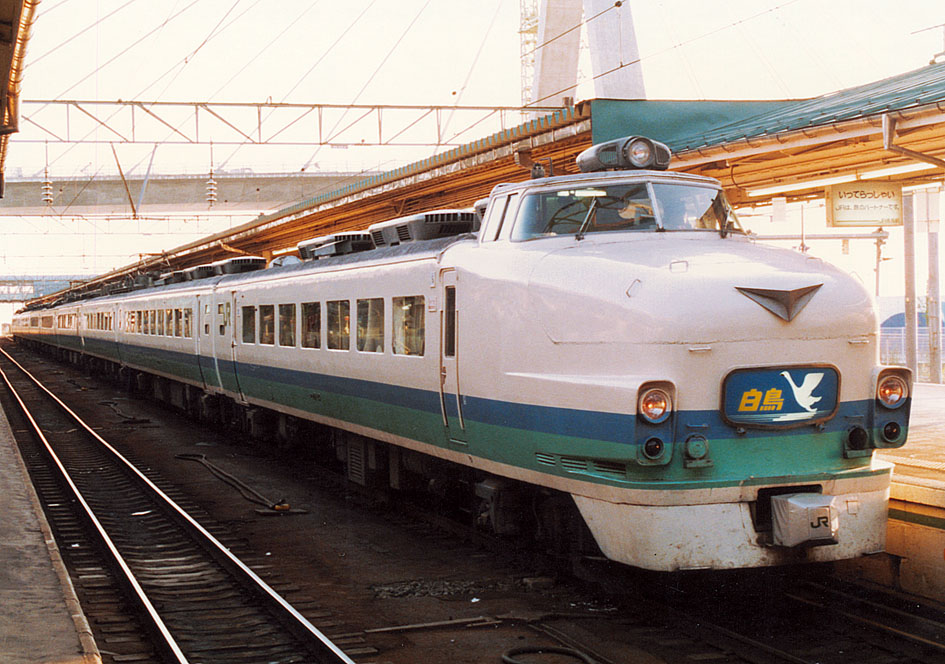
A 485 series EMU on a Hakuchō service at Aomori Station in 1991

=== Limited express ===
From 1 October 1961, the train was upgraded to become a limited express service operating between Osaka and Aomori and Ueno via Naoetsu using KiHa 80 series diesel multiple units. From 1965, the Ueno services were separated to become the Hakutaka, and the Hakuchō was amended via Niigata. 485 series electric multiple units were used from October 1972. From 1988, the rolling stock was refurbished and repainted in a new livery of cream with light blue and dark blue waistline stripes. Hakuchō services between Osaka and Aomori ran until 2 March 2001.

=== Kaikyo Line limited express ===
From 1 December 2002, the "Hakuchō" name was revived for services between Hachinohe and Hakodate, coinciding with the opening of the Tohoku Shinkansen extension from Morioka to Hachinohe, replacing the earlier locomotive-hauled Kaikyō rapid services which operated between Morioka and Hakodate.

From the start of the revised timetable on 4 December 2010, with the opening of the Tohoku Shinkansen from Hachinohe to Shin-Aomori, the Hakuchō and Super Hakuchō trains were also shortened to run from Shin-Aomori to Hakodate via Aomori.

=== Withdrawal ===
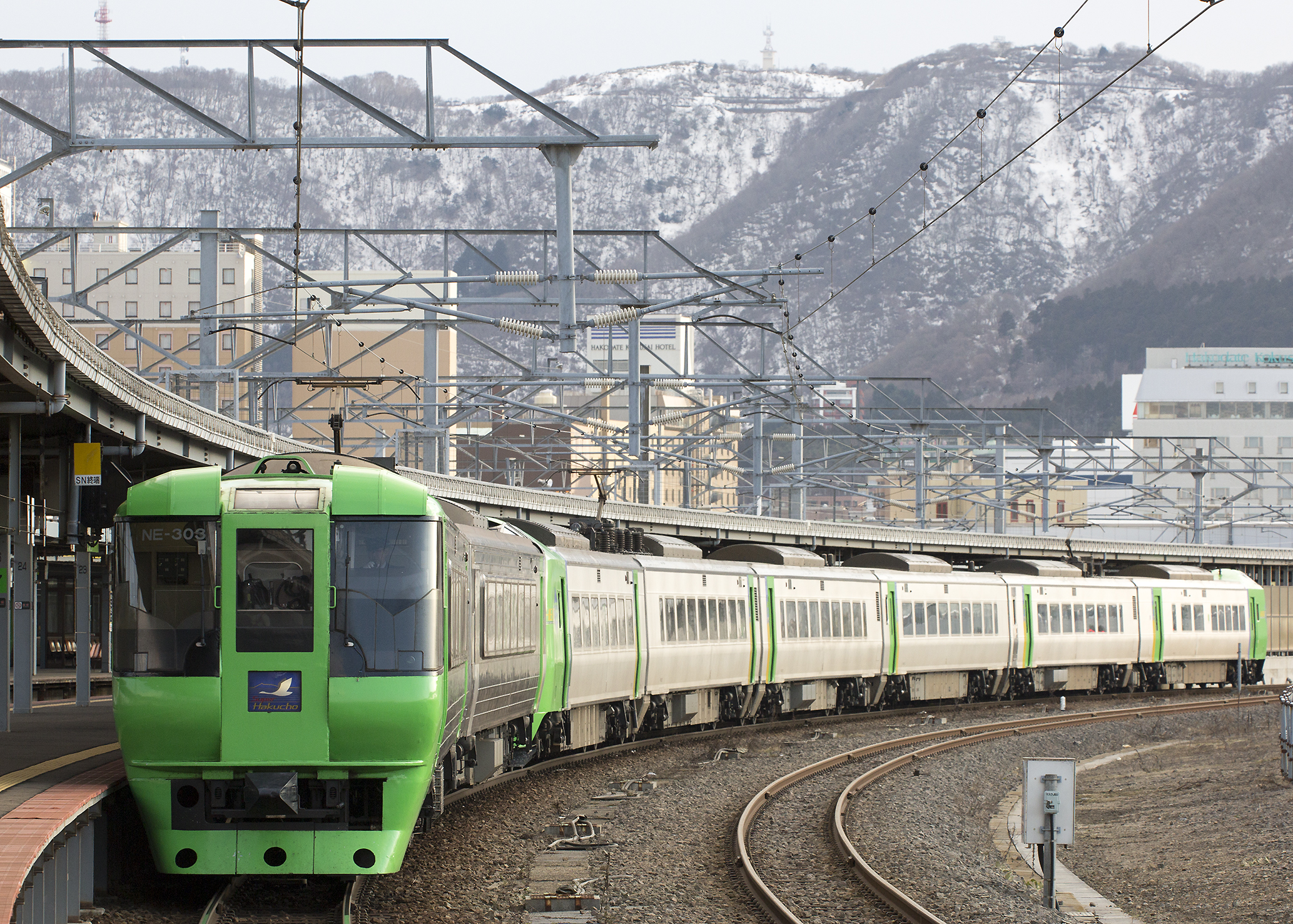
A JR Hokkaido 785-300 series two-car EMU and 789 series six-car EMU combination on a Super Hakuchō service in March 2016

The Hakucho and Super Hakucho services were discontinued in March 2016 ahead of the opening of the Hokkaido Shinkansen high-speed line. The last services operated on 21 March 2016.

== See also ==
- List of named passenger trains of Japan
