= Tappi-Kaitei Station =

Former railway station in Sotogahama, Aomori Prefecture, Japan

Tappi-Kaitei Station 竜飛海底駅
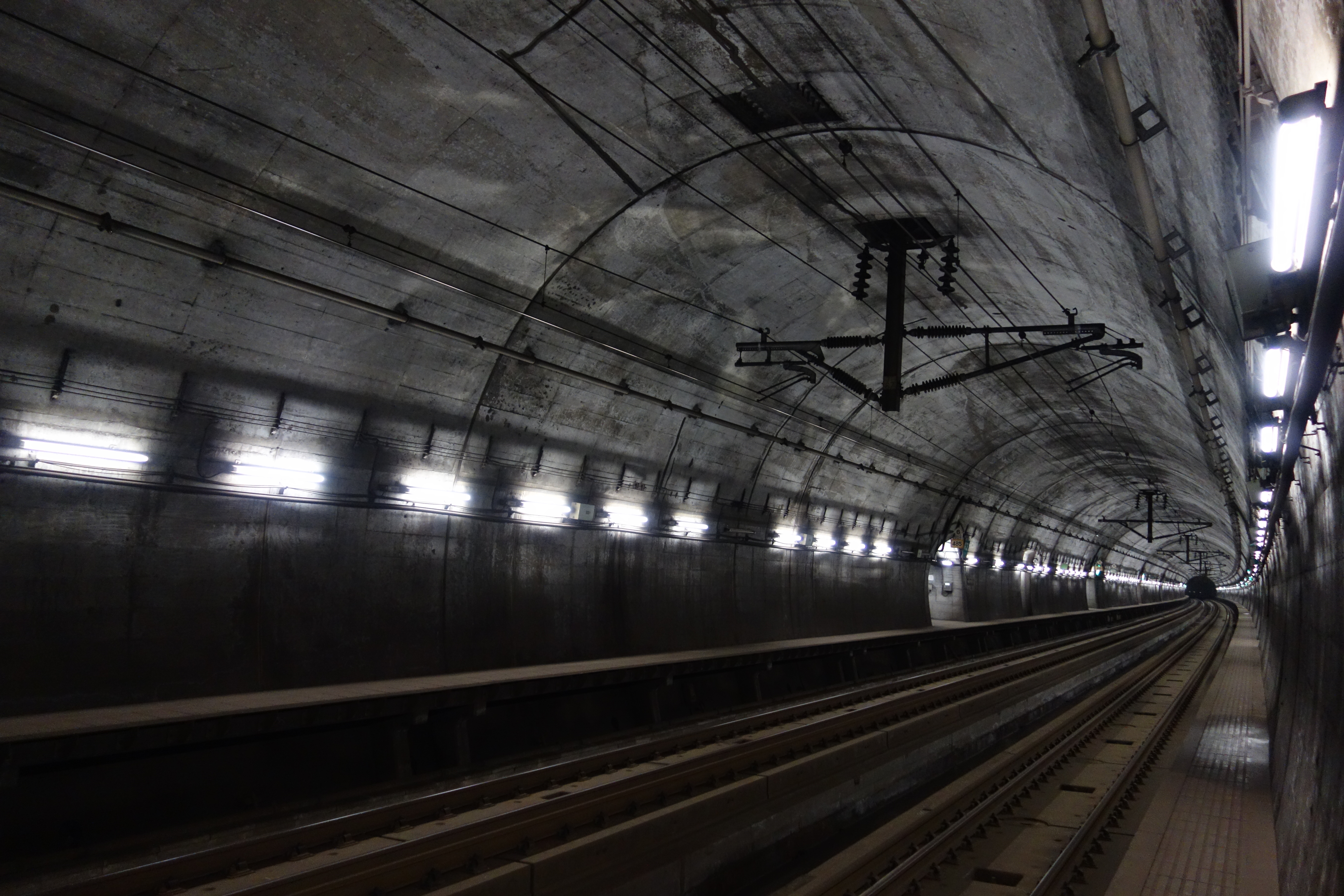

General information
- Location: Sotogahama, Higashitsugaru District, Aomori; Japan
- Coordinates: 41°15′26″N 140°20′52.1″E
- Operator: JR Hokkaido
- Line: Kaikyo Line

Other information
- Status: Closed

History
- Opened: 13 March 1988
- Closed: 2014

Former services
Preceding station	JR Hokkaido	Following station
Yoshioka-Kaitei towards Hakodate	Tsugaru-Kaikyo Line	Tsugaru-Imabetsu towards Naka-Oguni
Yoshioka-Kaitei towards Kikonai	Kaikyo Line	Tsugaru-Imabetsu towards Naka-Oguni
Location
- Location within Japan

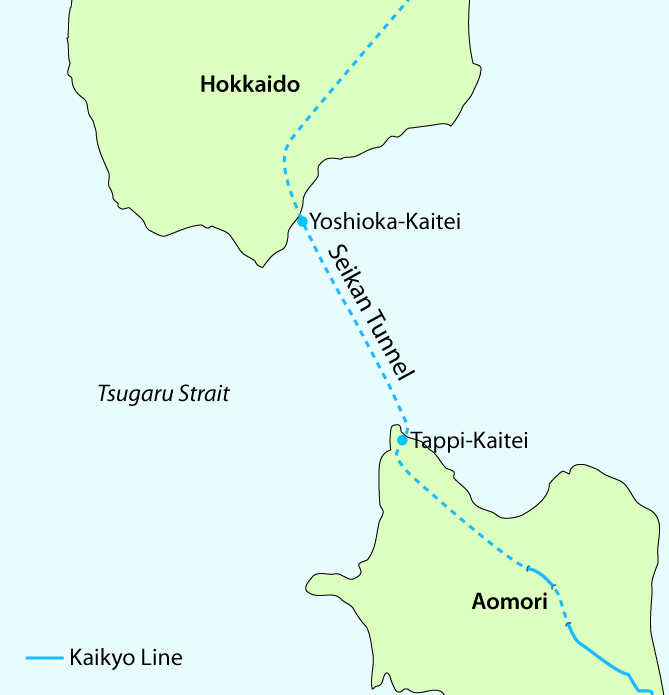
Map showing the Seikan Tunnel and the two underground stations

Tappi-Kaitei Station (竜飛海底駅, Tappi-Kaitei-eki) was a railway station on the Kaikyo Line in Sotogahama, Aomori, Japan, operated by Hokkaido Railway Company (JR Hokkaido). The station was located within the Seikan Tunnel below the seabed of the Tsugaru Strait linking the main Japanese island of Honshu with the northern island of Hokkaido. It was closed to passengers from November 10, 2013, to make way for the construction of the Hokkaido Shinkansen high-speed train line. It now serves as an emergency escape point for the tunnel, and is also accessible to visitors as part of the Seikan Tunnel Museum.

== Lines ==
Tappi-Kaitei Station was served by the Kaikyō Line, but only a few trains actually stopped at this station.

== Station layout ==
Tappi-Kaitei Station had two opposed side platforms serving two underground tracks. However, only the northbound platform was used. The platforms are connected to the surface by an underground cable car (funicular), the Seikan Tunnel Tappi Shakō Line. The station housed a museum detailing the construction and operation of the tunnel.

The Seikan Tunnel Tappi Shakō Line funicular is now an attraction at the Seikan Tunnel Museum which is located at ground level at the top of the cable car line (as opposed to the previous museum which was located in the tunnel at the bottom of the cable car line).

Yoshioka-Kaitei Station, Japan's deepest underground station which also officially closed on March 14, 2014, is located on the Hokkaido side of the tunnel.

=== Platforms ===
1	■ Kaikyo Line	for Hakodate
2	■ Kaikyo Line	for Aomori and Hachinohe

== History ==
Tappi-Kaitei Station opened on March 13, 1988. It was closed to passengers from November 10, 2013 due to construction work connected with the Hokkaido Shinkansen, and officially closed on March 14, 2014.

== See also ==
- List of railway stations in Japan
