= Kaikyō Line =

Coordinates: 41°22′28.16″N 140°17′13.2″E

Overview
- Termini: Naka-Oguni; Kikonai

Service
- Type: Freight rail

Technical
- Line length: 87.8 km (54.6 mi)

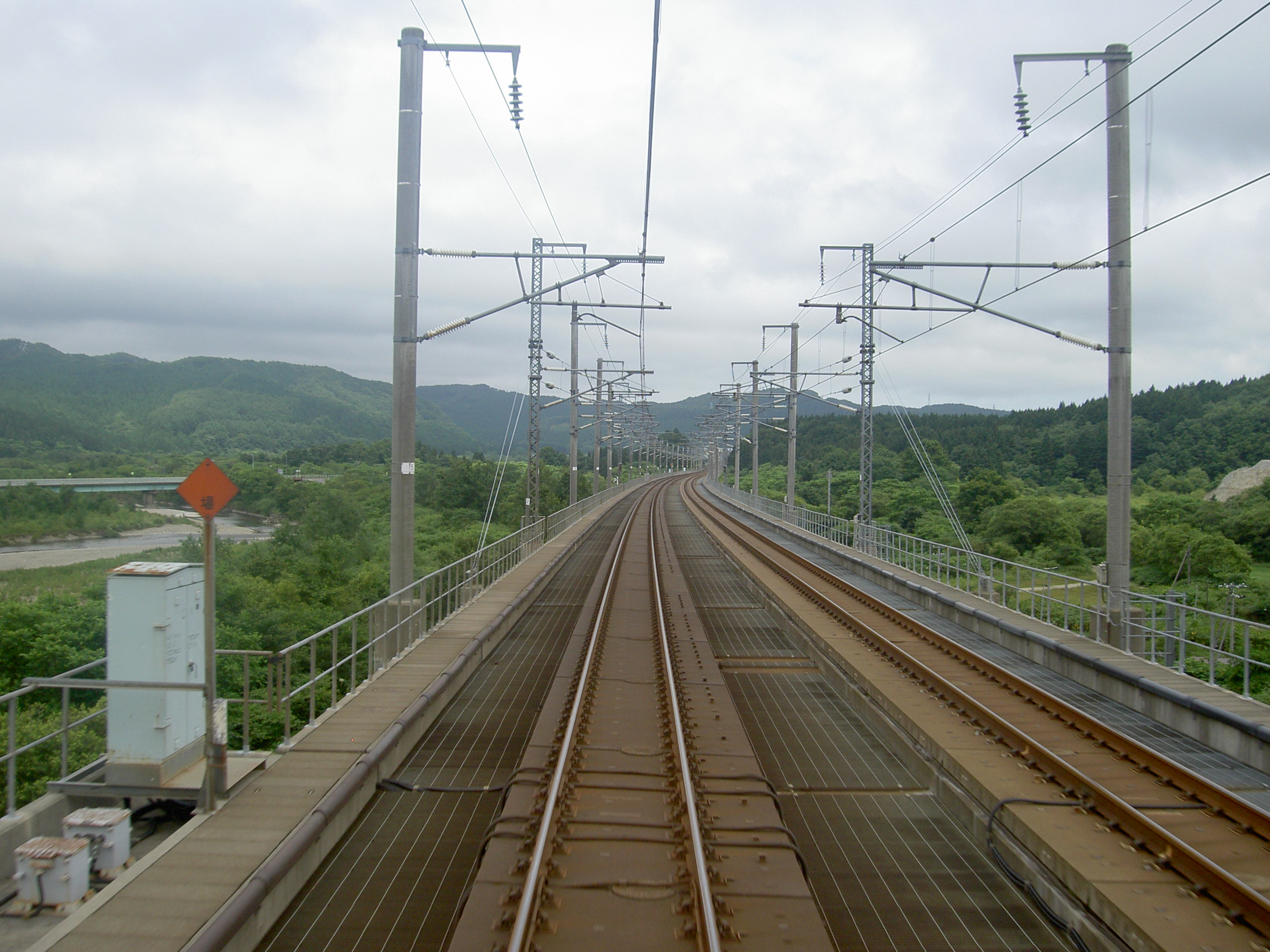
Kaikyō Line (Tappi-Kaitei - Tsugaru-Imabetsu) prior to the conversion to dual-gauge

The Kaikyō Line (海峡線, Kaikyō-sen) is an 87.8 km (54.6 mi) railway line operated by Hokkaido Railway Company (JR Hokkaido). The line connects Naka-Oguni Station in Sotogahama, Aomori, through the Seikan Tunnel connecting Honshu and Hokkaido, to Kikonai Station in Kikonai, Hokkaido.

The line was opened on 13 March 1988 in conjunction with the opening of the Seikan Tunnel. In addition to passenger trains, freight services operated by Japan Freight Railway Company (JR Freight) operated on the line.

The Hokkaido Shinkansen commenced operation on 26 May 2016 replacing all conventional line passenger services, with the Kaikyō Line now only used by freight trains (and from May 2017 the luxury cruise train Train Suite Shikishima).

== Facilities ==
The line was built to accommodate the future Hokkaido Shinkansen, but when the line opened in 1988 it was built solely with 1,067mm narrow gauge track which was the standard for both JR passenger and freight lines.

In preparation for the Hokkaido Shinkansen, the line was converted to dual gauge - 1,067mm narrow gauge and 1,435 mm standard gauge track.

The line was originally electrified at 20 kV AC (50 Hz) and was changed in May 2016 to the Shinkansen-standard 25 kV AC (50 Hz). To continue freight operations, JR Freight introduced Class EH800 dual-voltage locomotives.

The junction of the Tsugaru Line and the Kaikyō Line is Shin‑Naka‑Oguni Signal Station (新中小国信号場, Shin-Naka-Oguni Shingōjō)[ja], 2.3 km (1.4 mi) north of Naka-Oguni Station. Approximately 1.4 km (0.87 mi) north of Shin‑Naka‑Oguni Signal Station the Kaikyō Line curves to the right, with the outbound track passing underneath both Hokkaido Shinkansen tracks before merging with it and entering the Ohira Tunnel (大平トンネル, Ōhira Tonneru).

Two stations on the line were inside the Seikan Tunnel. Tappi-Kaitei Station and Yoshioka-Kaitei Station stations were both officially closed in March 2014 with the platforms being removed and the two stations converted to emergency evacuation points (named Tappi Fixed Point and Yoshioka Fixed Point respectively).

In preparation for the opening of the Hokkaido Shinkansen, all conventional line passenger services ceased operating on 21 March 2016. On 26 March 2016, the Hokkaido Shinkansen commenced operation.

== Stations ==
- Naka-Oguni Station
- Okutsugaru-Imabetsu Station (Shinkansen station with facilities for freight trains on the Kaikyō Line)
- Tappi-Kaitei Station (closed 2014)
- Yoshioka-Kaitei Station (closed 2014)
- Shiriuchi Station (closed 2014)
- Kikonai Station

== History ==
The line was opened on 13 March 1988 in conjunction with the opening of the Seikan Tunnel. Originally the line ran both freight and conventional line passenger trains including daytime Limited Express Hakuchō (connecting Aomori to Hakodate) and night train Hokutosei (connecting Ueno Station in Tokyo with Hakodate and Sapporo).

Three of the stations on the Kaikyō Line - Tappi-Kaitei, Yoshioka-Kaitei, and Shiriuchi - were officially closed on 15 March 2014 due to construction work connected with the Hokkaido Shinkansen, which opened on 26 March 2016. From that time, this line is now a freight-only route (except for luxury cruise train Train Suite Shikishima which commenced operation in May 2017).

== See also ==
- Seikan Tunnel Tappi Shako Line - the cable car (funicular) at Tappi-Kaitei Station is now an attraction at the Seikan Tunnel Museum
