= Fukushima (surname) =

Fukushima (written: 福島) is a Japanese surname. Notable people with the surname include:

- Chisato Fukushima (福島 千里; born 1988), Japanese sprinter
- Haruka Fukushima (フクシマ ハルカ), Japanese manga artist
- Jun Fukushima (福島 潤; born 1976), Japanese voice actor
- Keido Fukushima (福島 慶道; 1933–2011), Japanese Zen Buddhist
- Koji Fukushima (福島 康司; born 1973), Japanese cyclist
- Kunihiko Fukushima, Japanese computer scientist
- Masami Fukushima (福島 正実; 1929–1976), Japanese science fiction editor, translator and writer
- Fukushima Masanori (福島 正則; 1561–1624), Japanese daimyō
- Kikujirō Fukushima (福島 菊次郎; 1921–2015), Japanese photojournalist
- Mizuho Fukushima (福島 瑞穂; born 1955), Japanese politician, chairperson of Social Democratic Party
- Rila Fukushima (福島 リラ), Japanese fashion model and actress
- Shigeo Fukushima (福島 滋雄; born 1943), Japanese swimmer
- Shinichi Fukushima (福島 晋一; born 1971), Japanese cyclist
- Tadashi Fukushima (runner) (福島 正; born 1964), Japanese long-distance runner
- Takanori Fukushima (福島 孝徳; born 1942), Japanese neurosurgeon
- Fukushima Yasumasa (福島 安正; 1852–1919), Japanese general
- Yuki Fukushima (福島 由紀; born 1993), Japanese badminton player
- Yumiko Fukushima (福島 弓子), former Japanese announcer, wife of Ichiro Suzuki
