= Seikan Tunnel =

Undersea railway tunnel in Japan

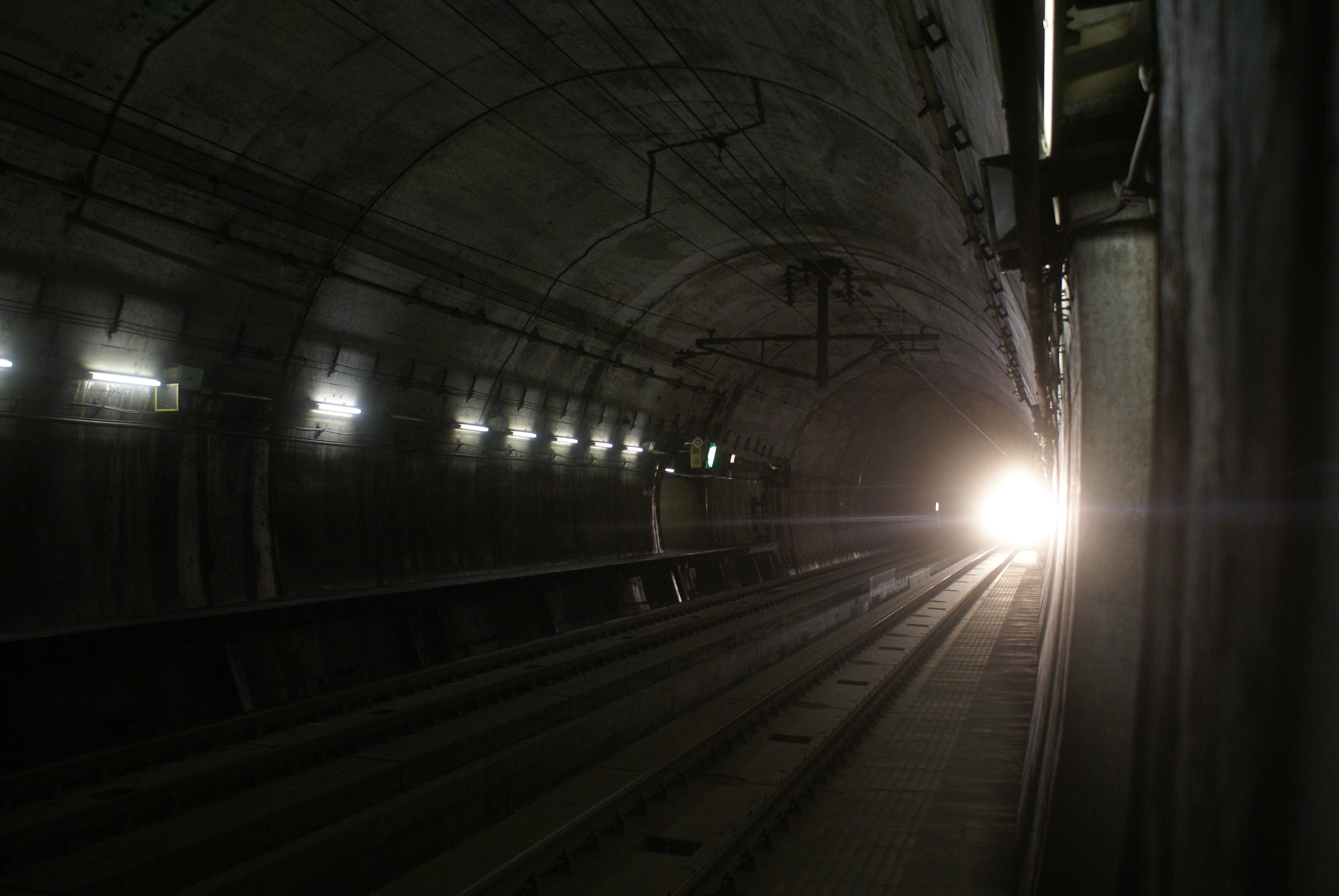
- Train approaching Tappi-Kaitei Station in July 2008

Overview
- Location: Beneath the Tsugaru Strait
- Coordinates: 41.3157°N 140.3351°E
- Status: Active
- Start: Shiriuchi, Hokkaido (41.592278°N 140.321806°E)
- End: Imabetsu, Aomori Prefecture, Honshu (41.177611°N 140.458333°E)

Operation
- Opened: March 13, 1988; 38 years ago
- Owner: Japan Railway Construction, Transport and Technology Agency
- Operator: JR Hokkaido
- Character: Passenger and freight

Technical
- Line length: 53.85 km (33.46 mi); 23.3 km (14.5 mi) undersea
- No. of tracks: 2
- Track gauge: Dual gauge: 1,435 mm (4 ft 8 1/2 in) standard gauge for Shinkansen; 1,067 mm (3 ft 6 in) narrow gauge for freight
- Electrified: Overhead line, 25 kV 50 Hz AC
- Operating speed: Normal: 160 km/h (100 mph); During major holidays: 260 km/h (160 mph)

The Seikan Tunnel (Japanese: 青函トンネル, Seikan Tonneru or 青函隧道, Seikan Zuidō) is a 53.85-kilometre (33.5-mile) dual-gauge railway tunnel in Japan, with a 23.3-kilometre (14.5-mile) segment running beneath the seabed of the Tsugaru Strait, which separates Aomori Prefecture on Honshu, Japan's main island, from the northern island of Hokkaido. The tunnel's track level lies approximately 100 metres (330 ft) below the seabed and 240 metres (790 ft) below sea level. Following several decades of planning and construction, the tunnel opened on 13 March 1988.

The Seikan Tunnel forms part of the standard-gauge Hokkaido Shinkansen as well as the narrow-gauge Kaikyō Line operated by the Hokkaido Railway Company (JR Hokkaido). Its name, "Seikan," is derived from the on'yomi readings of the first characters of Aomori (青森), the nearest major city in Honshu, and Hakodate (函館), the nearest major city in Hokkaido.

By total length, the Seikan Tunnel is the world’s longest undersea tunnel, surpassing even the Channel Tunnel (although the latter has a longer undersea section at 37.9 kilometres (23.5 mi) vs 23.3 kilometres (14.5 mi) for the Seikan Tunnel). It is also the deepest railway tunnel below sea level and was the deepest transport tunnel of any kind until Norway's Hitra Tunnel opened in 1994. It is the second longest main-line railway tunnel following Switzerland’s Gotthard Base Tunnel, which began operations in 2016.

== History ==
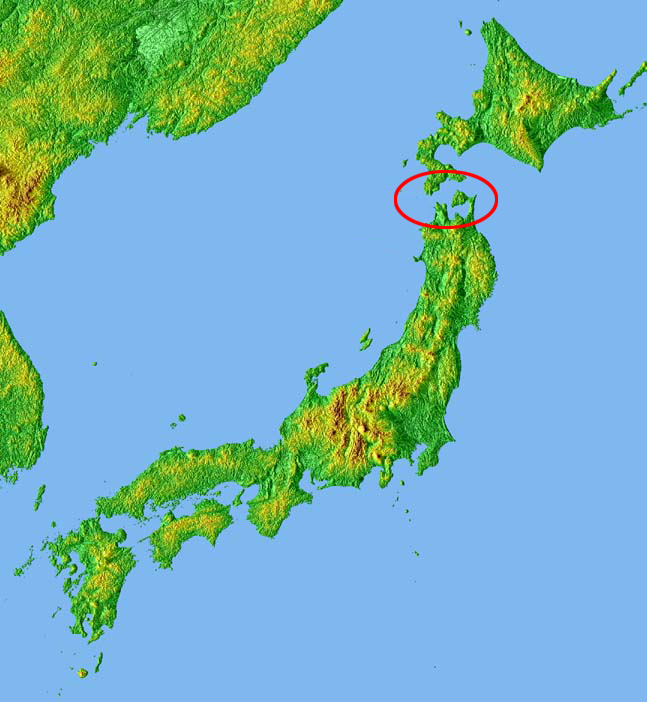
Location of the Tsugaru Strait in Japan

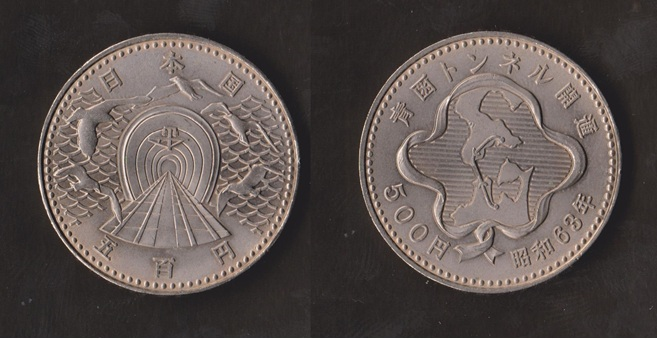
1988 Seikan Tunnel 500 yen coin

The idea to connect the islands of Honshu and Hokkaido by a fixed link was proposed by the Imperial Japanese Army in the late 1920s for strategic reasons and was part of the army's idea of linking the Japanese main islands with Japanese-held Korea and the Sakhalin Islands, the latter then being divided with Japan and the Soviet Union.

The tunnel plan was handed over to the Ministry of Railways in 1946, with preliminary geological surveys and feasibility studies beginning on 24 April of that year induced by the loss of overseas territory at the end of World War II and the need to accommodate returnees. In 1954, five ferries, including the Tōya Maru, sank in the Tsugaru Strait during a typhoon, killing 1,430 passengers. The following year, Japanese National Railways (JNR) expedited the tunnel feasibility study. Also of concern was increasing traffic between the two islands; a booming economy saw traffic levels on the JNR-operated Seikan Ferry double to 4,040,000 passengers a year from 1955 to 1965, and cargo levels rose 1.7 times to 6,240,000 tonnes a year. Inter-island traffic forecast projections made in 1971 predicted increasing growth that would eventually outstrip the ability of the ferry pier facility, which was constrained by geographical conditions.

On 22 March 1964, the Japan Railway Construction Public Corporation was established, and excavation work began that year. In September 1971, the decision was made to commence work on the tunnel. Drilling began in 1972 from both sides—Hamana on the northern tip of Honshu, and Yunosato in Hokkaido. To avoid danger from earthquakes, the tunnel goes through dense volcanic rock. The tunnel was constructed using conventional construction methods, including blasting with the New Austrian tunneling method (NATM) and tunnel boring machines (TBMs). A Shinkansen-capable cross section was selected with plans to extend the Shinkansen network. Arduous construction in difficult geological conditions proceeded despite multiple challenges including drilling difficulties, tunnel floodings, and the 1973 oil crisis, which delayed completion of the tunnel. 34 workers were killed during construction.

The necessity for the project was questioned at times during construction, as ferry traffic predictions made in 1971 were overestimates. Instead of the traffic rate increasing as predicted to a peak in 1985, it peaked earlier in 1978 and then proceeded to decrease. The decrease was attributed to the slowdown in Japan's economy since the 1973 oil crisis and to advances made in air transport facilities and longer-range sea transport. Construction had begun during the heyday of the Seikan ferry route, but the ferry became mostly supplanted by air travel. On the freight side, due to the deterioration of labour-management relations at JNR at the time, including frequent strikes and legal compliance struggles, freight rail transportation stagnated and lost market share to ferries and coastal shipping.

By mid-1982, the tunnel had only 1,000 metres (3,300 ft) to complete. On 27 January 1983, Japanese Prime Minister Yasuhiro Nakasone pressed a switch that set off a blast that completed the pilot tunnel. Following this, on 10 March 1985, Minister of Transport Tokuo Yamashita symbolically bored through the main tunnel by detonating a dynamite charge on the last few meters of the earth.

The tunnel was opened on 13 March 1988, having cost a total of ¥1.1 trillion (US$7 billion) to construct (almost 12 times the original budget, much of which was due to inflation over the years). Construction of the tunnel itself was projected to cost ¥538.4 billion, but actually cost ¥745.5 billion, and construction of the line running through the tunnel was projected to cost ¥689 billion, but ended up costing ¥900 billion. To commemorate the opening, a commemorative 500 yen coin depicting the tunnel was issued by the Japan Mint in 1988.

Once the tunnel was completed, it became used by all railway transport between Honshu and Hokkaido, particularly conventional express trains, with all passenger services combined making up to 21 round trips daily (up to 50 round trips if freight trains are included). Similarly, the commuter ferry service between the two islands run by JNR was also discontinued. However, 90% of passenger transport is still by plane due to travel time and cost. For example, to travel between Tokyo Station and Shin-Sapporo Station by train takes eight hours, with transfer from Shinkansen to narrow-gauge express train at Shin-Hakodate-Hokuto Station. By air, the journey is 1 hour and 45 minutes, or 3 hours and 30 minutes including airport access times. Deregulation and competition in Japanese domestic air travel has brought down prices for the Tokyo-Sapporo route, making rail travel more expensive in comparison.

The Hokutosei overnight train service began after the completion of the Seikan Tunnel; a later and more luxurious Cassiopeia overnight train service was often fully booked. Both were discontinued following the commencement of Hokkaido Shinkansen services in March 2016, with freight trains being the only regular service utilizing the narrow-gauge line since then.

Because the tunnel is shared with freight trains, Shinkansen services cannot operate at their full design speed within it. While trains run at up to 320 km/h (200 mph) south of Morioka and 260 km/h (160 mph) outside the tunnel, speeds are limited to 160 km/h (99 mph) inside the tunnel. During major holiday periods, freight traffic is suspended, allowing Shinkansen trains to operate through the tunnel at up to 260 km/h (160 mph), reducing travel times.

Before the opening of the tunnel, research was conducted into a "Train on Train" where a narrow-gauge freight train would piggyback on top of a faster standard-gauge train. However, research ended in 2015 without being placed into use.

As of March 2019, Shinkansen services connected Tokyo Station and Shin-Hakodate-Hokuto Station in 3 hours and 58 minutes, with the final extension to Sapporo Station proposed to open in 2038 and expected to reduce the Tokyo–Sapporo rail journey to approximately five hours.

== Surveying, construction and geology ==
Tsugaru Strait traffic data
Year	Passengers (persons/yr)	Freight (t/yr)	Mode
1955	2,020,000	3,700,000	Seikan Ferry
1965	4,040,000	6,240,000	Seikan Ferry
1970	9,360,000	8,470,000	Seikan Ferry
1985	9,000,000 (Note: This may be a typographical error in the source)	17,000,000	1971 Forecast
1988	~3,100,000	—	Seikan Tunnel
1999	~1,700,000	—	Seikan Tunnel
2001	—	>5,000,000	Seikan Tunnel
2016	2,110,000	—	Seikan Tunnel (Hokkaido Shinkansen)

Typical tunnel cross section. (1) Main tunnel, (2) service tunnel, (3) pilot tunnel, (4) connecting gallery

Profile diagram of the undersea tunnel section

Surveying started in 1946 and construction began in 1971. By August 1982, less than 700 metres of the tunnel remained to be excavated. First contact between the two sides was in 1983. The Tsugaru Strait has eastern and western necks, both approximately 20 km (12 mi) across. Initial surveys undertaken in 1946 indicated that the eastern neck was up to 200 metres (656 feet) deep with volcanic geology. The western neck had a maximum depth of 140 metres (459 feet) and geology consisting mostly of sedimentary rocks of the Neogene period. The western neck was selected, with its conditions considered favourable for tunnelling.

The geology of the undersea portion of the tunnel consists of volcanic rock, pyroclastic rock, and sedimentary rock of the Neogene period. The area is folded into a nearly vertical syncline, which means that the youngest rock is in the centre of the strait and encountered last. Divided roughly into thirds, the Honshu side consists of volcanic rocks (notably andesite and basalt); the Hokkaido side consists of sedimentary rocks (notably Tertiary period tuff and mudstone); and the centre portion consists of Kuromatsunai strata (Tertiary period sand-like mudstone). Igneous intrusions and faults caused crushing of the rock and complicated the tunnelling procedures.

Initial geological investigation occurred from 1946 to 1963, which involved seabed drilling, sonic surveys, submarine boring, observations using a mini-submarine, and seismic and magnetic surveys. To establish a greater understanding, a horizontal pilot bore was undertaken along the line of the service and main tunnels. Tunnelling occurred simultaneously from the northern and southern ends. The dry land portions were tackled with traditional mountain tunnelling techniques, with a single main tunnel. However, for the 23.3-kilometre (14.5 mi) undersea portion, three bores were excavated with increasing diameters respectively: an initial pilot tunnel, a service tunnel, and finally the main tunnel. The service tunnel was periodically connected to the main tunnel with a series of connecting drifts, at 600–1,000-metre (2,000–3,300 ft) intervals. The pilot tunnel serves as the service tunnel for the central five-kilometre portion. Beneath the Tsugaru Strait, the use of a tunnel boring machine (TBM) was abandoned after less than 2 kilometres (1.2 miles), owing to the variable nature of the rock and difficulty in accessing the face for advanced grouting. Blasting with dynamite and mechanical picking were then used to excavate.

== Structure ==
Initially, only 1,067 mm (3 ft 6 in) narrow-gauge track was laid through the tunnel, but in 2005 the Hokkaido Shinkansen project started construction which included laying dual gauge track (providing standard gauge track capability) and extending the Shinkansen network through the tunnel. Shinkansen services to Hakodate commenced in March 2016, and are proposed to be extended to Sapporo by 2038. The tunnel has 52 km (32 mi) of continuous welded rail.

Two stations used to be within the tunnel—Tappi-Kaitei Station and Yoshioka-Kaitei Station. They were the first railway stations in the world built under the sea. Both closed with the construction of the Hokkaido Shinkansen, but continue to serve as emergency escape points. In the event of a fire or other disaster, the stations provide the equivalent safety of a much shorter tunnel. The effectiveness of the escape shafts at the emergency stations is enhanced by having exhaust fans to extract smoke, television cameras to help route passengers to safety, thermal (infrared) fire alarm systems, and water spray nozzles. Before the construction of the Hokkaido Shinkansen, both stations contained museums detailing the history and function of the tunnel that could be visited on special sightseeing tours. The museums are now closed and the space provides storage for work on the Hokkaido Shinkansen.

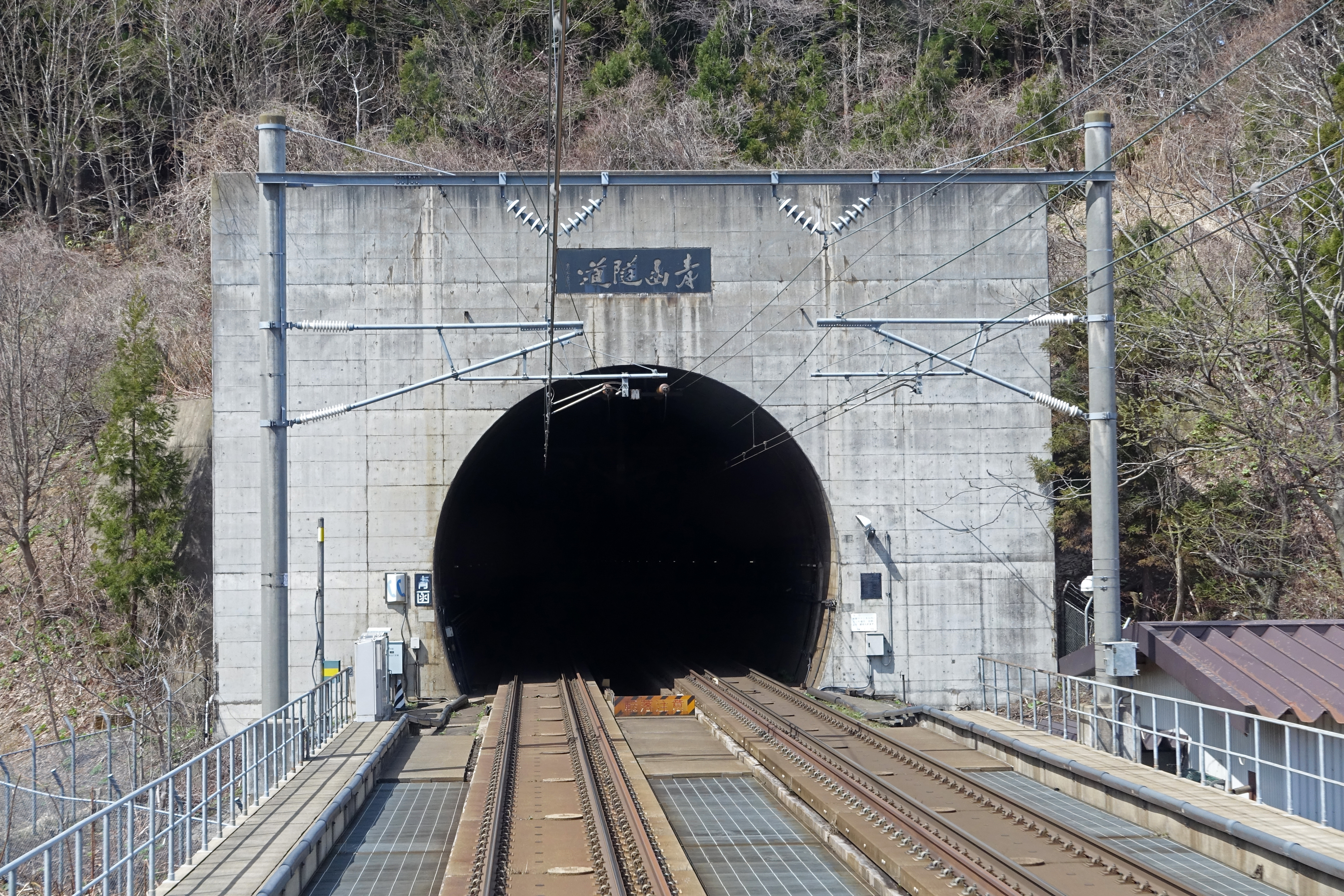
Entrance to the tunnel from Honshu side; note the dual-gauge tracks

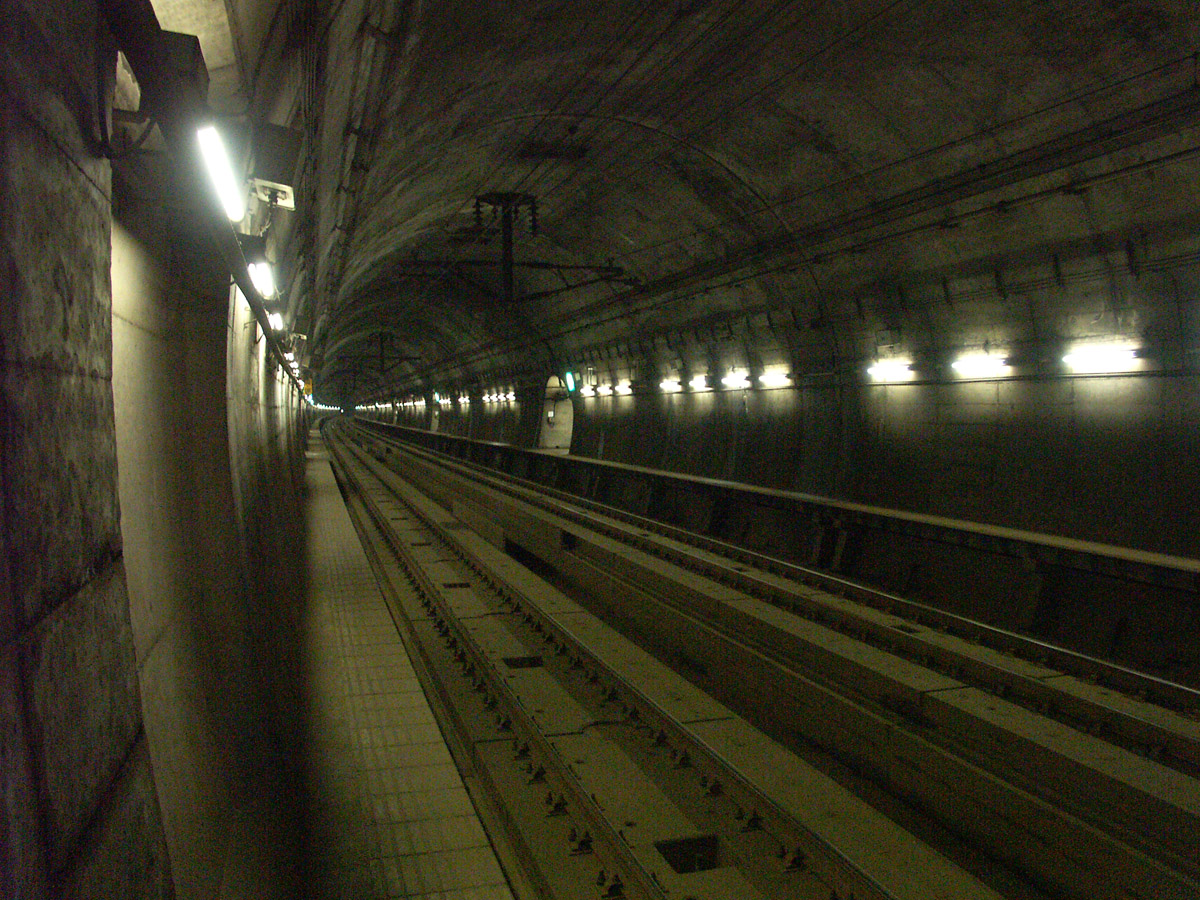
Former Yoshioka-Kaitei Station platform

== Maintenance ==
A 2002 report by Michitsugu Ikuma described, for the undersea section, that "the tunnel structure appears to remain in a good condition." The amount of inflow has decreased with time, although it "increases right after a large earthquake". In March 2018 at 30 years of age, maintenance costs amounted to ¥30 billion (US$286 million) since 1999. Plans are to increase travel speeds and provide mobile communication along the full track.

== See also ==
- Seikan Tunnel Tappi Shakō Line
- Train on Train, an experimental concept for conveying freight at higher speeds through the tunnel
- JR Freight Class EH800, AC freight locomotives used to haul trains through the Seikan Tunnel
- Sakhalin–Hokkaido Tunnel
- Bohai Strait tunnel

Records
Preceded by Daishimizu Tunnel	Longest tunnel 1988–2016	Succeeded by Gotthard Base Tunnel
