= Haneda Airport Access Line =

Under construction railway line in Japan

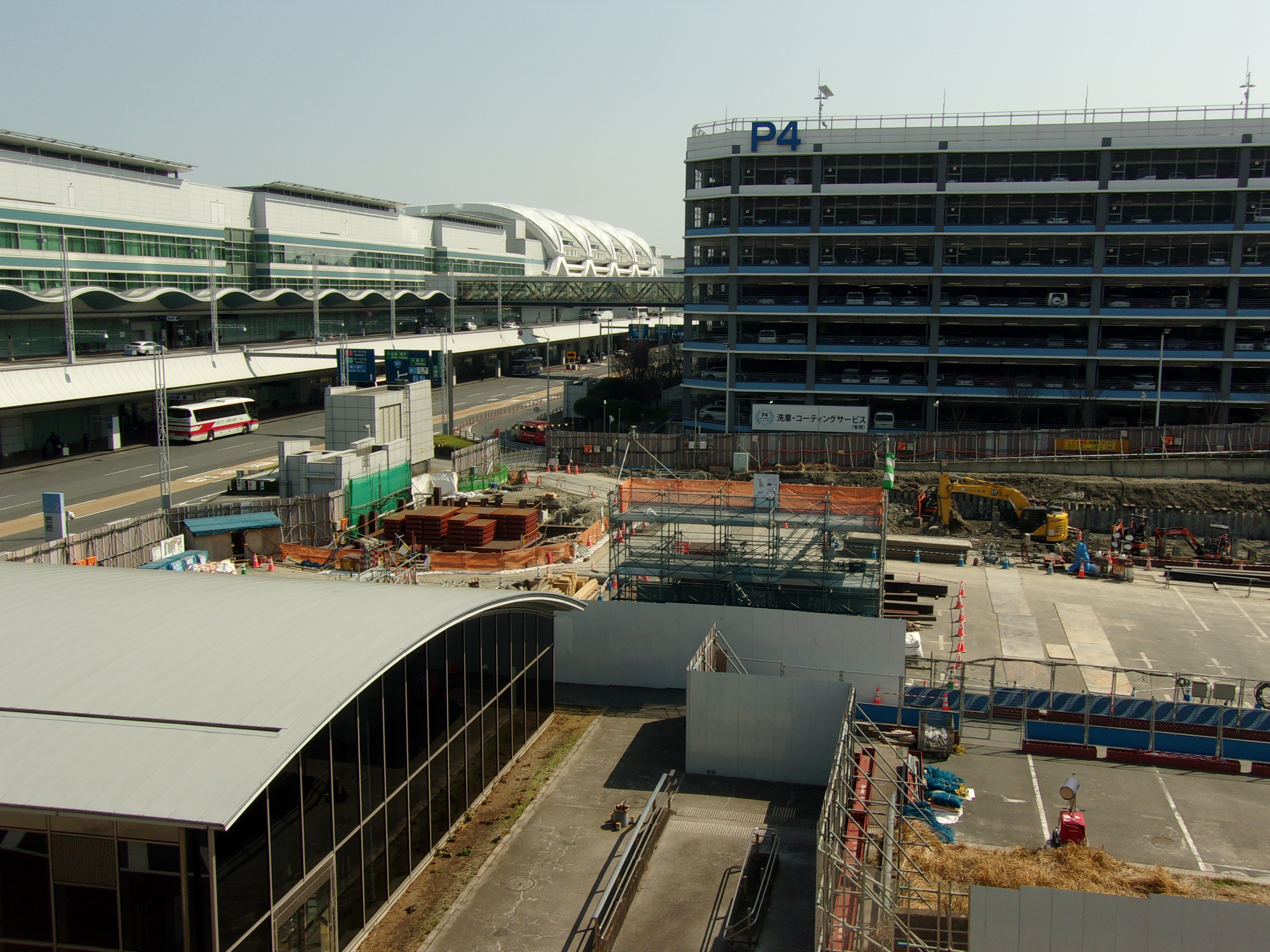
- New station under construction at Haneda Airport in March 2024

Overview
- Native name: 羽田空港アクセス線
- Status: Under construction
- Locale: Tokyo
- Termini: Tokyo; Haneda Airport New Station

Service
- Type: Heavy rail

History
- Planned opening: JFY 2031 (tentative)

Technical
- Num of tracks: 2
- Track gauge: 1,067 mm (3 ft 6 in)
- Electrification: Overhead line, 1,500 V DC

The Haneda Airport Access Line (Japanese: 羽田空港アクセス線, Hepburn: Haneda-kūkō akusesu-sen) is a commuter rail line under construction by the East Japan Railway Company (JR East) that will link Haneda Airport to central Tokyo. Construction began on 2 June 2023.

As of July 2024, JR East plans to open the new line in fiscal year 2031 with direct through services to Tokyo Station and Shin-Kiba Station. A third through service to Osaki and Shinjuku is also planned. Construction of the new line is estimated to cost about ¥280 billion (2022) (equivalent to ¥297.14 billion or US$1.96 billion in 2024).

== History ==
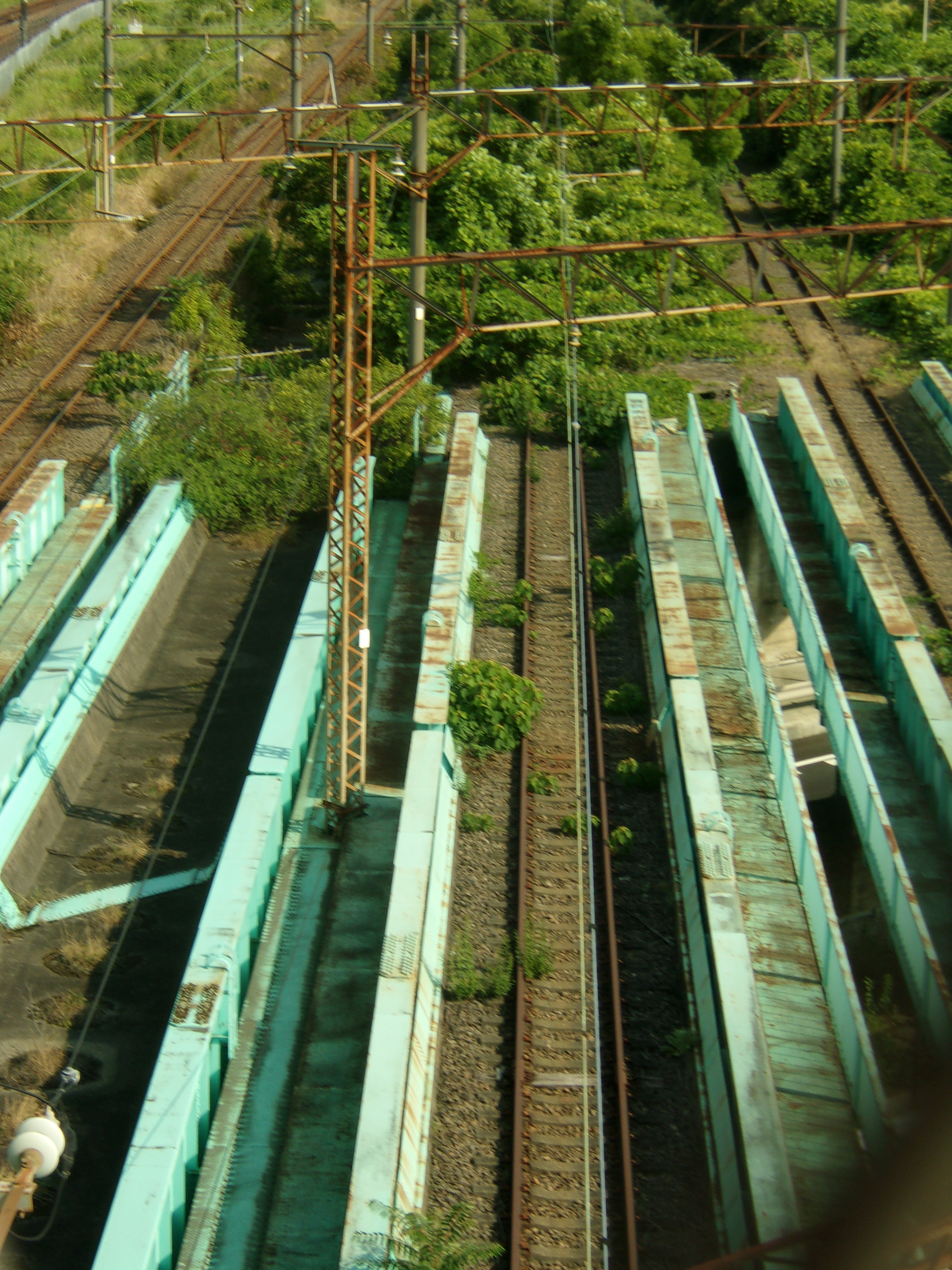
Disused Tokaido Freight Line in Oi, Shinagawa. These lines will be re-purposed to carry trains to Haneda.

Due to the growing demand of air travelers using Haneda Airport, especially international travelers, JR East officially announced in the "JR East Group Management Vision V" issued in 2013 that they aimed to improve the accessibility to the airport. In 2014, JR East released its fundamental construction plan for the accessibility improvement. The plan proposed that an existing disused freight line located southeast of Tamachi Station be connected via a single-track tunnel to the Tokaido Line. The newly-constructed section would be about 5 km (3.1 mi) long, running from the existing Tokyo Freight Terminal to a new Haneda Airport New Station (羽田空港新駅, Haneda-kūkō shin-eki) to be located between Terminal 1 and Terminal 2 via a new underwater tunnel. JR East initially aimed to open a portion of the new line in time for the 2020 Summer Olympics, but was unable to do so due to environmental assessment needs.

In the JR East Group Management Vision "Move Up" issued in 2018, JR East proposed constructing three conventional lines departing from the airport connecting to different parts of Tokyo: the East Yamanote route, the West Yamanote route and the Coastal Area route. In 2019, JR East officially launched the environmental assessment for the new lines.

In 2021, JR East announced that they have received Ministry of Land, Infrastructure, Transport and Tourism approval for construction of the East Yamanote route and intended to start construction in 2022, for completion by 2029. Construction of the line officially began on 2 June 2023 with a groundbreaking ceremony.

The plans for the line were altered in April 2024 in order to preserve a portion of the Meiji-era Takanawa Embankment that was discovered in 2023. JR East announced that the starting point of the new line would be moved 100 meters to the south (toward Shinagawa) in order to preserve a portion of the embankment in its current location.

== Routes ==
Three routes from Tokyo Freight Terminal onwards to the various points in central Tokyo are under construction.

- The East Yamanote route (東山手ルート) will run from the new airport station located between Terminals 1 and 2 of Haneda Airport to a point near Tamachi Station, using an unused freight line between Tamachi and Tokyo Freight Terminal to connect to the Tokaido Main Line (Ueno-Tokyo Line). By running through trains on the Ueno–Tokyo Line, through service can be offered to Tokyo Station, Ueno Station, and northbound lines including the Takasaki Line, Utsunomiya Line, and Joban Line, allowing service to the northern suburbs of Tokyo. Travel times between Tokyo Station and Haneda are estimated to decrease from the current 28 minutes to 18 minutes.
  - Route (Non-stop between Shimbashi Sta. and Haneda Airport): Tokyo Station - Shimbashi Station - (Though-service from/to Ōshio Freight Line which starts at a point between Tamachi Station and Hamamatsuchō Station) - (Tokyo Freight Terminal) - Haneda Airport Station
  - Plan to run 8 trains an hour and 144 trains a day.
- The Coastal Area Route (臨海部ルート) will connect Tokyo Freight Terminal to the Rinkai Line for Odaiba (Tokyo Teleport Station) and the Tokyo waterfront. This also allows for future through service to the Keiyo Line for Maihama (Tokyo Disney Resort) and points east in Chiba Prefecture. The travel time between Haneda and Shin-Kiba Station on the Keiyo Line would decrease from 41 minutes to 20 minutes.
- The West Yamanote Route (西山手ルート) will connect the new line to Oimachi Station on the Rinkai Line, which operates as a through service with the Saikyo Line connecting to major terminal stations on the west side of the Yamanote Line including Osaki, Ebisu, Shibuya, Shinjuku, and Ikebukuro, as well as points north in Tokyo and Saitama Prefecture. Travel time between Shinjuku and Haneda would be reduced from 43 minutes at present to 23 minutes.

== See also ==
- Keikyū Airport Line
- Tokyo Monorail
- Kama-Kama Line (proposed)
