= Japanese Central Railway School =

- 中央鉄道学園

Location
- 2 Chōme, Izumichō, Kokubunji, Tokyo; Japan

Information
- School type: National
- Opened: 1961
- Founder: Japanese National Railways
- Closed: 1987
- Teaching staff: Professors from the University of Tokyo and Hitotsubashi University

Japanese Central Railway School (中央鉄道学園, Chūō Tetsudō Gakuen) was a Japanese National Railways educational institution in Kokubunji, Tokyo.

== Overview ==
The school was not recognised as a university or college by the Ministry of Education, Science, Sports and Culture, even though Shinji Sogō, the 4th president of JNR, made serious efforts to raise the school to the status of "JNR University" so that its students could be university graduates. Professors from the University of Tokyo, Hitotsubashi University, and others were employed as part-time teaching staff. It was said that the school provided the equivalent of a university education under Sogō's administration.

Courses of study could last anywhere from a few days to three years, covering subjects such as train operation, train inspections and track maintenance. At its peak, it had more than 1000 students. It was the place for training new staff members, retraining employees who were changing roles or positions, and educating the work force on new policies or equipment.

The school was closed due to the privatization and division of Japan National Railways in 1987. Another building now occupies the site, but some parts of the earlier structure are preserved as "the remains of Tōsandō Musashimichi".
