= Tokyo Freight Terminal =

Tokyo Freight Terminal 東京貨物ターミナル駅
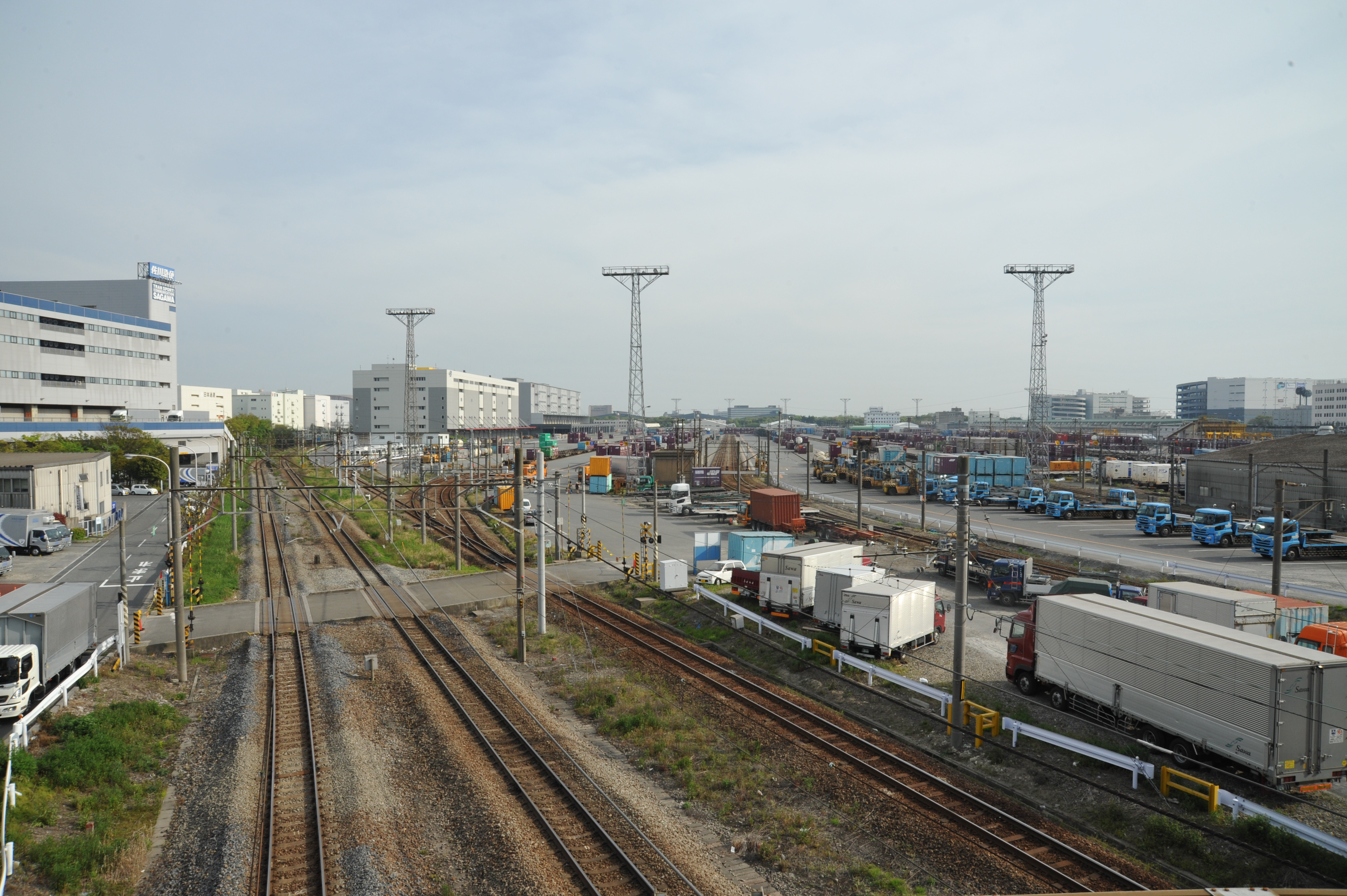
- Access tracks and overview (3 May 2010)

General information
- Location: 3-3-22 Yashio, Shinagawa-ku, Tokyo; Japan
- Coordinates: 35°35′26.99″N 139°45′16.79″E
- Operator: JR Freight; JR East
- Line: ■ Tōkaidō Freight Line
- Distance: 6.1 km from Tamachi; 7.1 km from Hamamatsuchō

History
- Opened: 1 October 1973
Location
- Location within Special wards of Tokyo Location within Tokyo Location within Japan

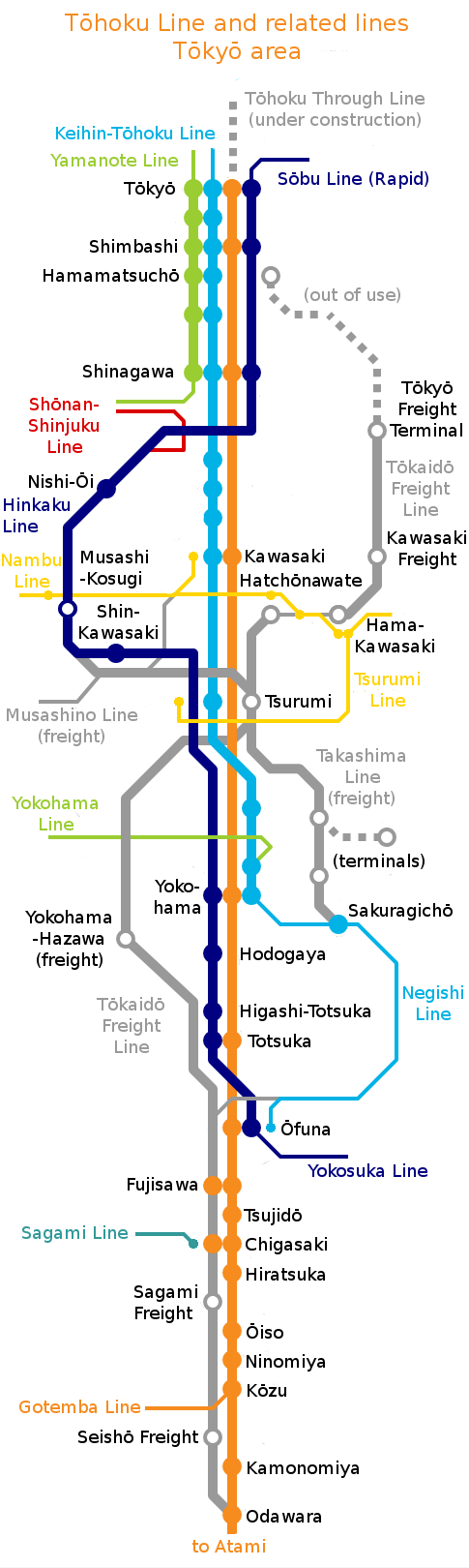
Location of the Tokyo Freight Terminal on the Tōkaidō Freight Line shown in grey in this map of the southern rail approaches to Tokyo

Tokyo Freight Terminal (東京貨物ターミナル駅, Tōkyō Kamotsu Tāminaru Eki) is a railway freight terminal operated by Japan Freight Railway Company (JR Freight) located in the Yashio district of Shinagawa, Tokyo, east of Omori and north of Haneda Airport.

It is the largest rail freight terminal in Japan and principally handles freight traffic to and from western Japan via the Tōkaidō Main Line. A number of companies operate dedicated logistics facilities at the station, including Yamato Transport, Sagawa Express, Nippon Express, and Kintetsu World Express.

The terminal is adjacent to the Tōkaidō Shinkansen Tokyo Depot. The closest passenger station is Ryūtsū Center Station on the Tokyo Monorail. The branch line on which the terminal is situated also originally extended from Tokyo Freight Terminal up to the Shiodome Freight Terminal (the site of the original Shimbashi Station) until its closure in 1986.

JR East plans to use this station to create the Haneda Airport Access Line.

== Gallery ==
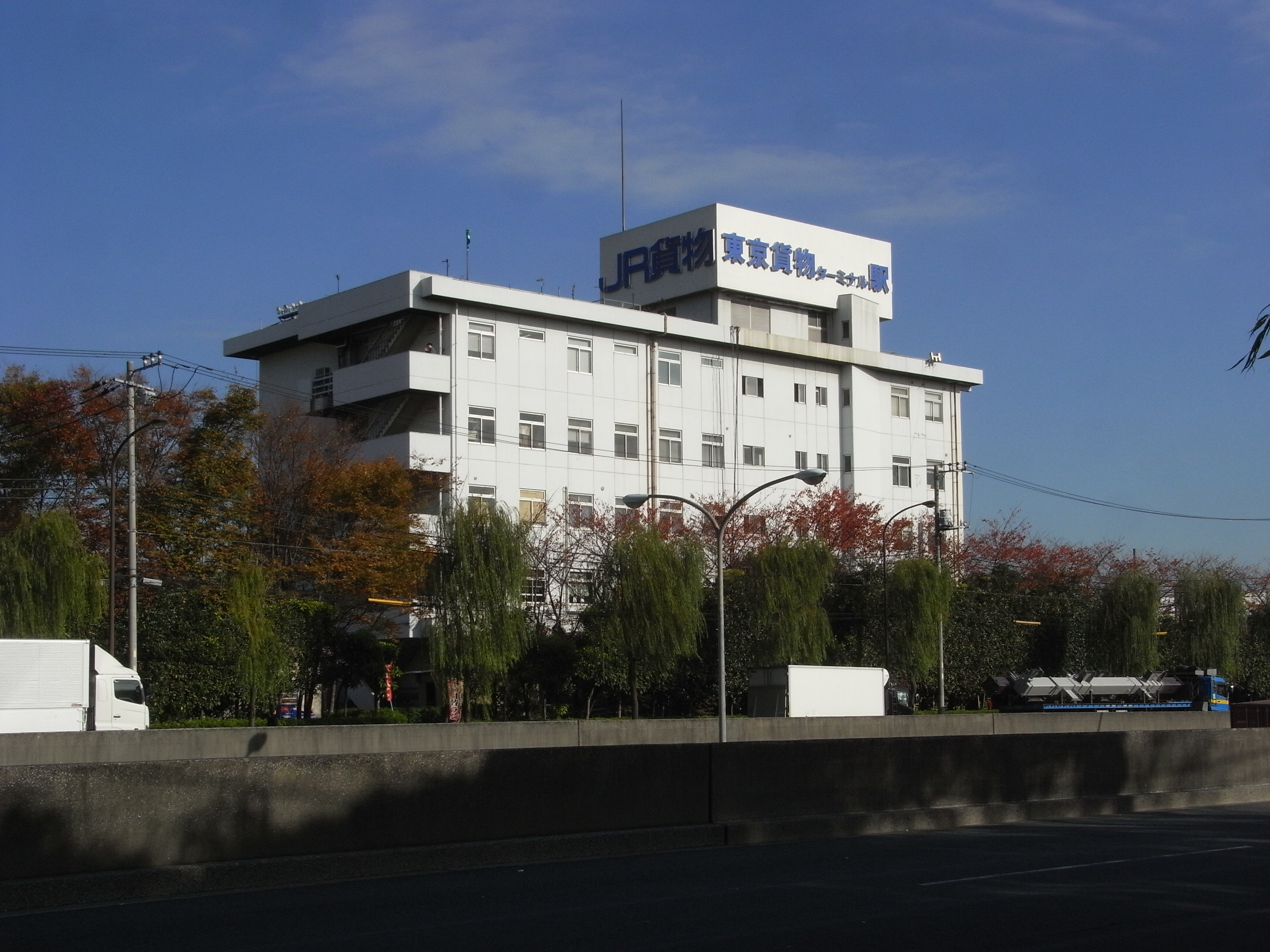
Main JR Freight office building

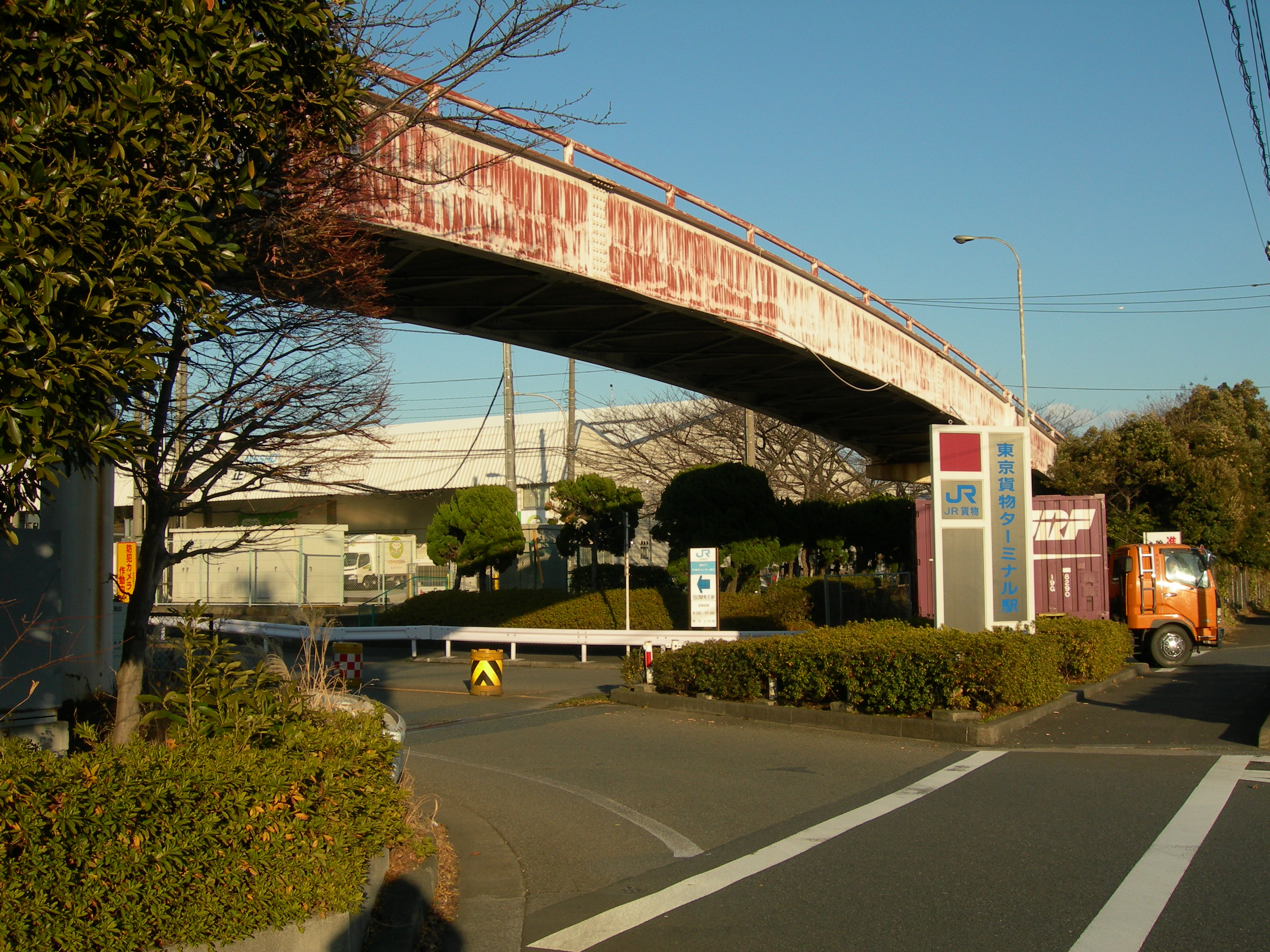
Road entrance

== History ==
Tokyo Freight Terminal opened on 1 October 1973. The station was absorbed into the JR Freight network upon the privatization of JNR on 1 April 1987.

== Surrounding area ==
- Japan Freight Railway (JR Freight) Central Training Center
- Central Japan Railway Company (JR Central) Tokyo Alternate inspection vehicle station
- Rinkai Line Torin Vehicle Station
- Tokyo Monorail Ryutsu Center Station
