= Shinkansen too hard ice cream =

Type of Japanese ice cream

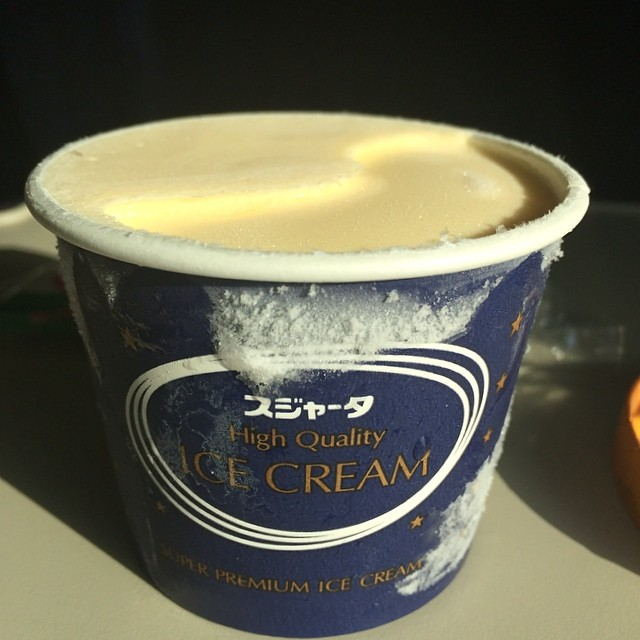
Sujahta Super Premium Ice Cream (2014 package), a.k.a. Shinkansen too hard ice cream

Sujahta Super Premium Ice Cream, colloquially known as Shinkansen too hard ice cream (Japanese: シンカンセンスゴイカタイアイス), is a type of ice cream sold mainly on Japanese shinkansen trains. The term first gained popularity on the internet, being used as a nickname on Twitter since about 2013. Since 2021, it has been adopted as the official sales name.

== Overview ==
The ice cream is produced by Sujahta, a Japanese dairy manufacturer. Due to storage methods and quality, this type of ice cream sold on trains is colder and harder than most. This is done so that passengers can enjoy the ice cream slowly on long-distance trips. Nonetheless, it still became known for the fact that it usually cannot be eaten when it is first received.

The product's official name is "Sujahta Super Premium Ice Cream," although JR Tokai Passengers commercialized it with the name Shinkansen too hard ice cream on its set sales packaging as of 2021.

== History ==
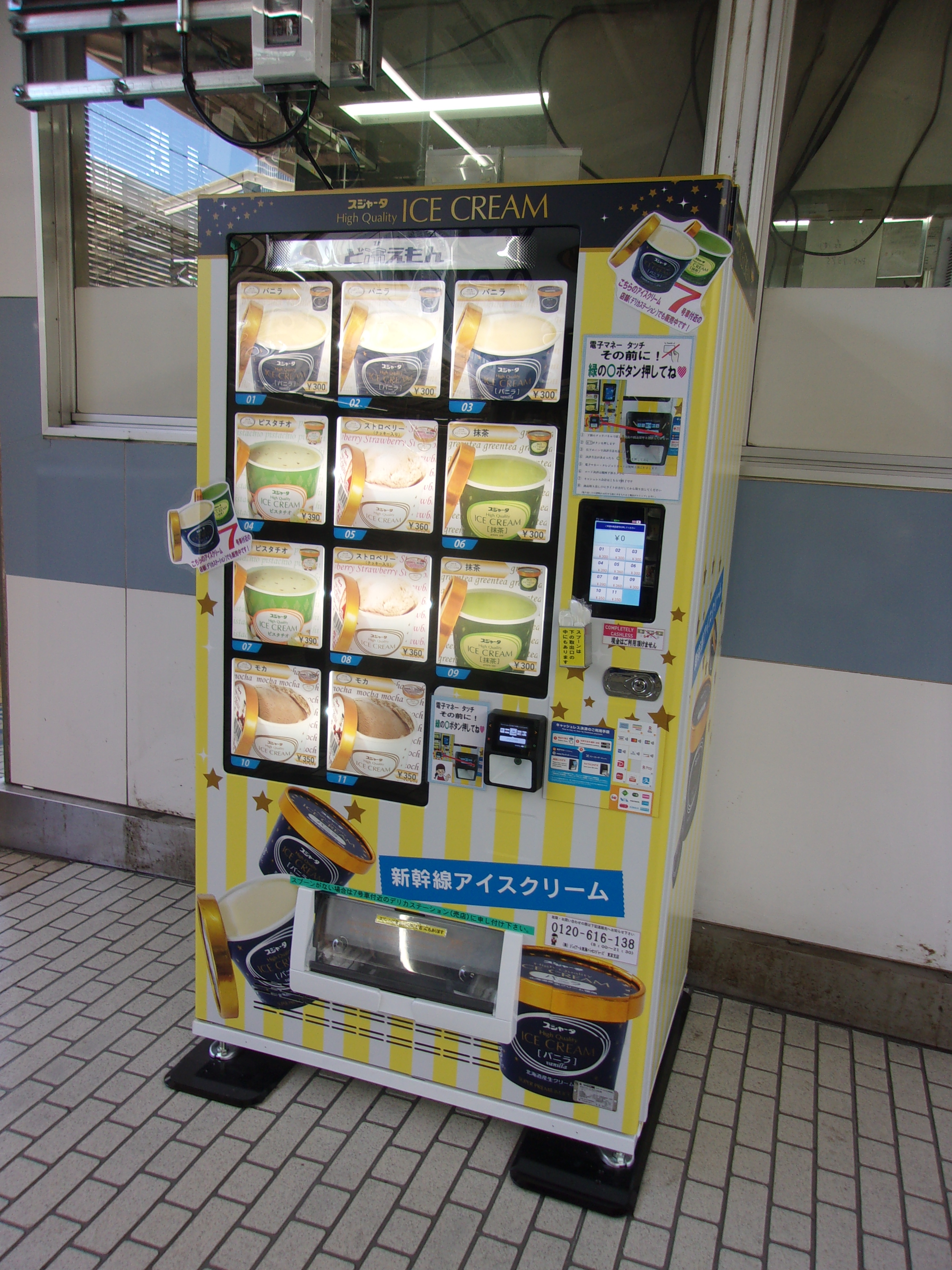
Vending machine on the Tokaido Shinkansen platform at Tokyo Station.

There was Shinkansen ice cream in the 1970s, and even then it was expensive and its ice cream was hard. In 1991, Sujahta began producing ice cream for sale on Shinkansen trains. The percentage of milk fat was increased in order to create a luxurious taste, so the product became hard.

Around 2000, a piece of vanilla ice cream cost 260 yen (around US$2.47 in 2000).

In February 2021, due to COVID-19, in-car sales on Shinkansen trains were suspended. However, due to many requests to buy them, it was announced that they will be sold online from that March while in-train sales are suspended. It was so well received that it sold out within minutes after its sale.

In July 2022, this ice cream began to be sold in vending machines at Tokyo Station.

As of December 2022, the product is available on the Tokaido Shinkansen, San'yō Shinkansen, Tōhoku Shinkansen, Yamagata Shinkansen, Akita Shinkansen, Hokuriku Shinkansen, and limited express trains Azusa and Hitachi, as well as at some station kiosks and the SCMaglev and Railway Park.

As of 2023, Shinkansen trains traveling between Tokyo and Shin-Osaka carry two ice cream carts of 22 pieces each, for a total of 44 pieces per train.

In August 2023, it was announced that onboard sales on Tokaido Shinkansen trains will be discontinued on October 31 due to a shortage of labor and declining demand.

== Hardness ==
There is no refrigeration equipment in the train car where the ice cream is kept, so dry ice is used as a refrigerant in in-car sales to maintain the quality of the ice cream. In addition, the low air content and high milk fat content, designed to be luxurious, make this ice cream incredibly cold and solid. A plastic spoon is included, but that is too hard to stick in the ice cream in its immediate state of purchase. Sometimes the lid cannot be removed.

=== Workarounds ===
The manufacturer, Sujahta, explains that one needs to wait 10 minutes before eating it. If purchased at train station kiosks where commercial freezers are available, they can be purchased in an easy-to-eat condition.

Consumers have experimented with various measures and posting them on social networking sites. One method that has been devised is "sticking a stick into an ice cream and pulling it straight out of the cup to eat it like an ice cream stick". Some people have tried pouring hot coffee over it to make an affogato, but according to reports, this did not work as the coffee froze on top instead of melting the ice cream.

=== Dedicated spoon ===
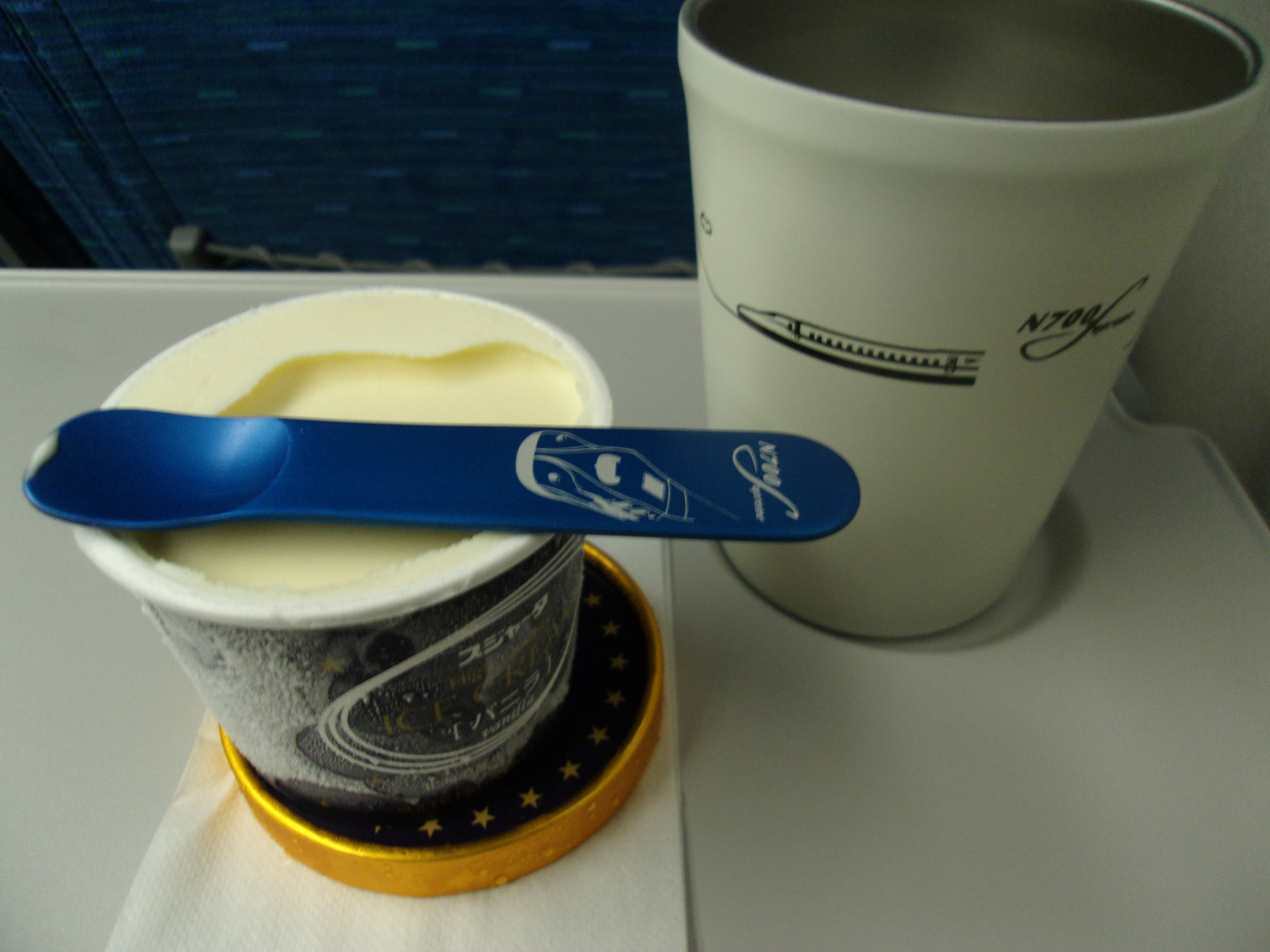
Spoon for ice cream with N700S design

The sale of metal spoons suitable for this ice cream had long been considered, but at the time, pre-washed metal spoons were not available and were not suitable for in-car sales, where they are supposed to be used immediately on the spot. However, in 2020, metal spoons pre-cleaned with pure water became available for the Shinkansen.

In 2014, the Shinkansen N700S Ice Cream Spoon, made of aluminum with high thermal conductivity, was launched. When it was first released, it sold out in just three days. Subsequently, variations were made that were not originally planned, and one variant featuring Doctor Yellow was re-released in 2022 after initially being released in 2021.

== Internet slang ==
The name Shinkansen too hard ice cream (Japanese: シンカンセンスゴイカタイアイス) was not originally an official name, but was first used on Twitter around 2013. It became popular to post a picture of the attached spoon stuck into the ice cream. The origin is speculated to be the Marunouchi too high Building, a structure that appears in the novel Ninja Slayer.

While "スゴイカタイ (凄い硬い)" is grammatically incorrect - the correct version being "スゴクカタイ（凄く硬い）" - the "スゴイ" variant is used by 59% of Japanese. Both expressions can be found on Twitter.

In October 2024, Japanese Vocaloid music producer Shannon released a song titled "Shinkansen Too Hard Ice Cream" (シンカンセンスゴイカタイアイス), commemorating the 60th anniversary of the Tokaido Shinkansen.
