= Tōkaidō Freight Line =

Railway line in Japan

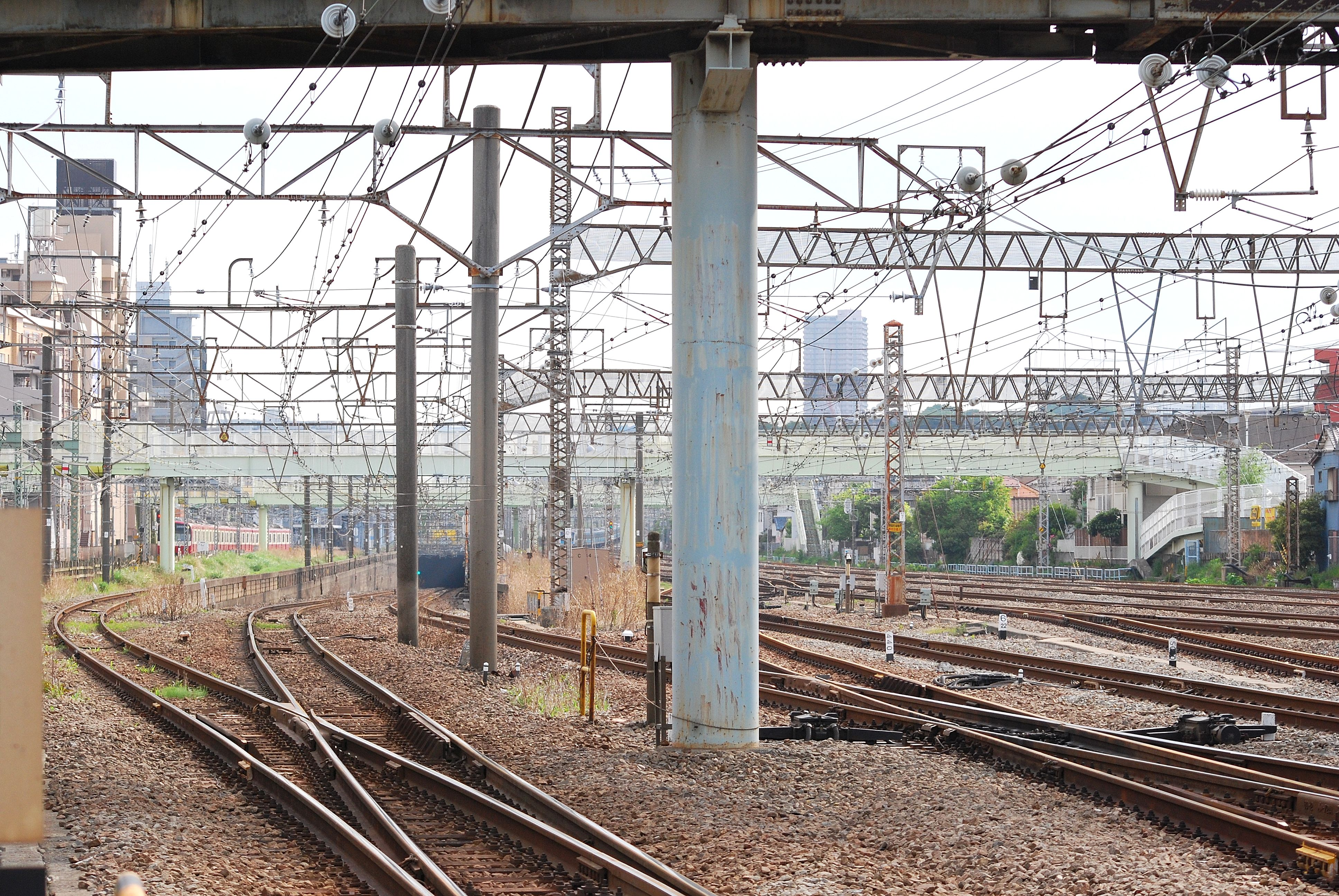
- Junction of Tōkaidō Freight Line (straight to the tunnel) and Takashima Line (diverting) at Tsurumi

Overview
- Owner: JR East
- Locale: Kantō region
- Termini: Odawara Station; Tokyo Freight Terminal (Hamamatsuchō Station)

Service
- Operator(s): JR East, JR Freight, Sotetsu

History
- Opened: 20 December 1914 (first section opened in 1872)

Technical
- Track gauge: 1,067 mm (3 ft 6 in)
- Electrification: Overhead catenary 1,500 V DC
Route map
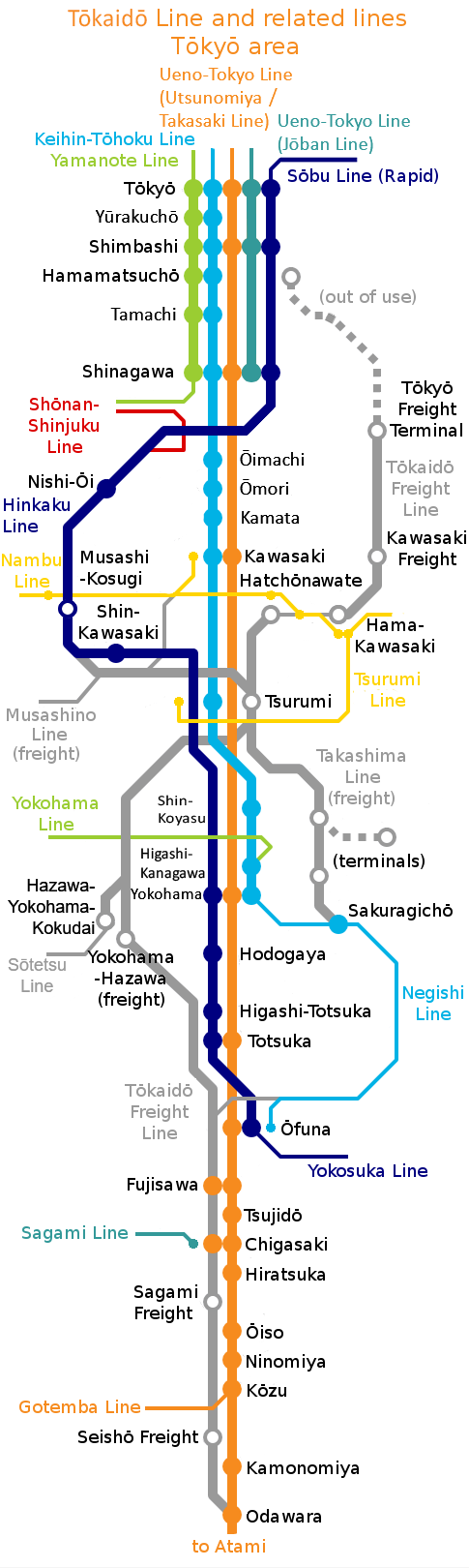

The Tōkaidō Freight Line (東海道貨物線, Tōkaidō Kamotsu-sen) is a railway line that links Odawara Station in Kanagawa Prefecture and Hamamatsuchō Station in central Tōkyō, Japan.

== Summary ==
The Tōkaidō Freight Line was first opened on 20 December 1914 between Shiodome Freight Terminal and Shinagawa Station, using the alignment of the first railway line ever to be built in Japan, the Tokyo-Yokohama Railway, originally opened in 1872.

The Tōkaidō Freight Line runs parallel to the immediate west of the Yokosuka and Tōkaidō passenger lines from Odawara Station to Higashi-Totsuka Station, where it veers west via Yokohama Hazawa freight station and long tunnels bypassing Yokohama. Near Tsurumi Station, the bypass rejoins the main passenger route for a short distance, and has connections to the freight-only Takashima Line (高島線) to Sakuragichō Station, the Hinkaku Line and Musashino Line. The freight line then curves east, briefly sharing tracks with the Nambu Branch Line between Hatchōnawate and Hama-Kawasaki stations, then veers north past Kawasaki freight station, under the entrance to Haneda Airport northward to the Tokyo Freight Terminal. The line north from here, currently dormant, continues to Hamamatsuchō Station alongside a branch of the Tōkaidō Shinkansen used to move empty rolling stock to and from a nearby depot. Beyond Hamamatsuchō Station the Tōkaidō Freight Line also continued to Shibaura Station (located on a branch line), the Shiodome Freight Terminal (the site of the original Shimbashi Station) and eventually to Tokyo Market Station (located at the Tsukiji fish market). The Tokyo Market Station closed in 1984, followed by Shibaura Station in 1985 and Shiodome Freight Terminal in 1986.

The latter dormant section was closed in the 1990s to enable construction of the Toei Ōedo Line subway near Hamamatsuchō Station.

Until 1980, the Tōkaidō Freight Line included the Hinkaku Line until it was converted for passenger use as part of the Yokosuka Line.

== Takashima Line ==
The freight-only Takashima Line is a branch of the Tōkaidō Freight Line between Tsurumi Station and Sakuragichō Station, giving access for freight trains to and from the Negishi Line. It branches off from Tsurumi Station and ends at Sakuragichō Station in Yokohama, with a branch between Tsurumi and Sakuragichō leading off to Shinkō Station located at Pier 4 of the Port of Kawasaki.

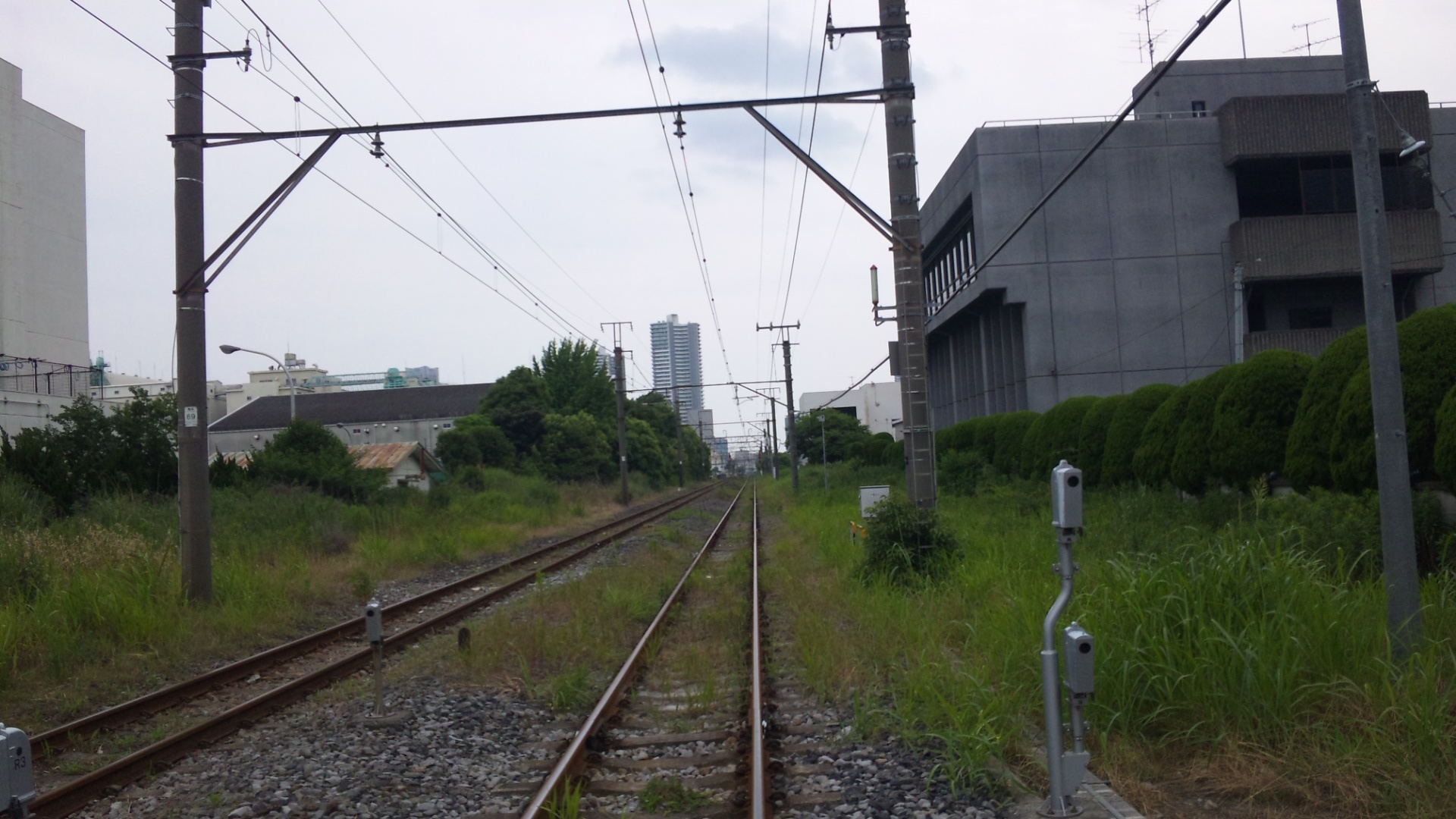
Takashima Line tracks, June 2010

== Future developments ==
=== Sōtetsu connections ===
The following lines are under construction by Sagami Railway (Sōtetsu) and the Japan Railway Construction, Transport and Technology Agency:

- a 2.7 km new underground line, called the Sōtetsu JR Link Line (相鉄ＪＲ直通線, Sōtetsu JR Chokutsū-sen), connecting Nishiya Station on the Sagami Railway Main Line with the Tōkaidō Freight Line. The line, initially expected to be completed by 2015, now pushed back to 2019, will enable direct passenger services from Sōtetsu lines to the Saikyō Line which runs across central Tokyo via the Yokosuka Line. The line eventually opened on 30 November 2019.

=== Haneda Airport connection ===
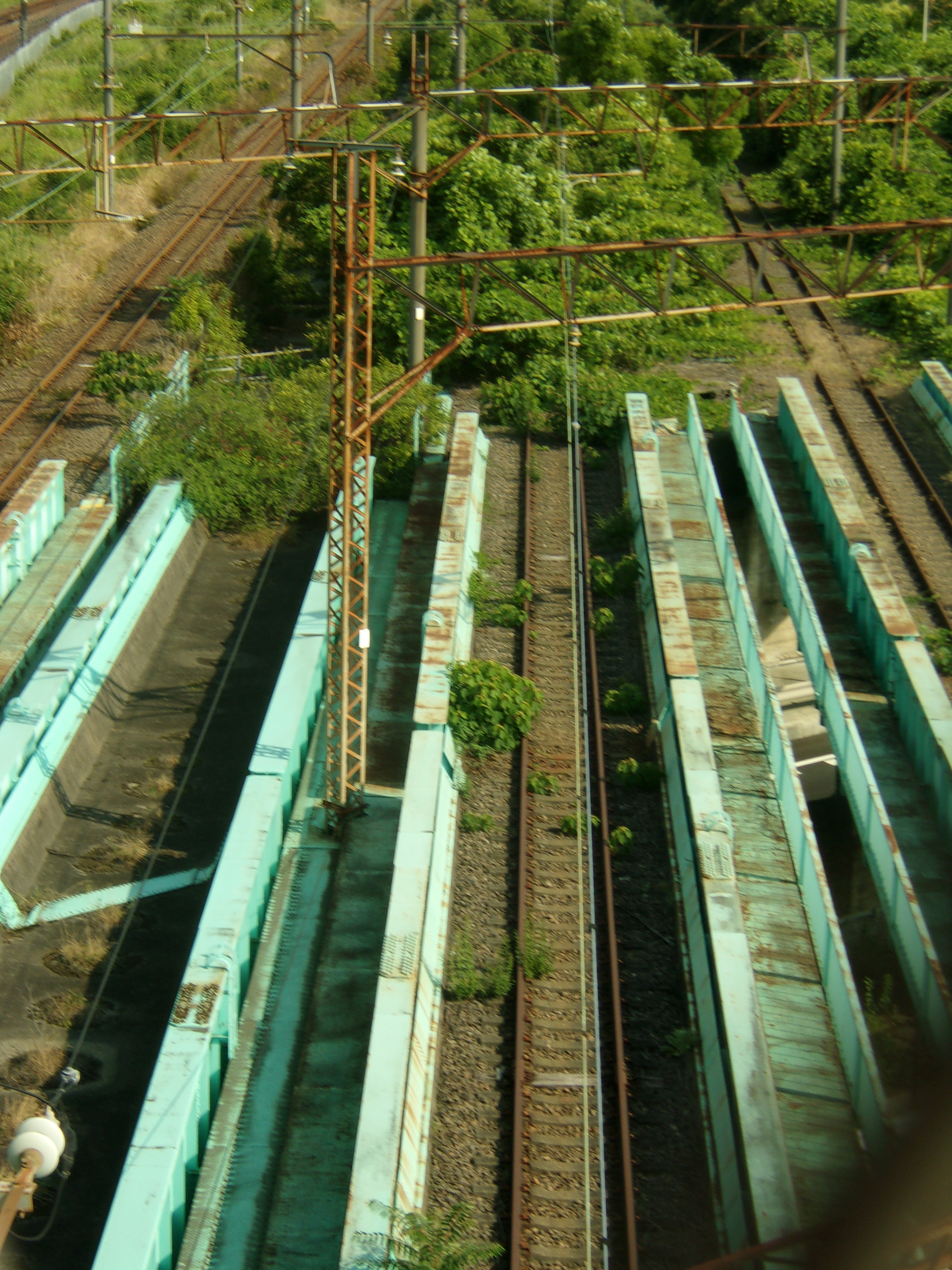
An abandoned portion of the Tōkaidō Freight Line in Shinagawa, expected to be rehabilitated for the Haneda Airport Access Line

Since 2000 there have been proposals to use part of the line for passenger access to Haneda Airport, which is located just south of the Tokyo Freight Terminal. JR East announced in 2013, after the award of the 2020 Summer Olympics, that it was considering using the disused part of the freight line as a passenger connection between the Yamanote Line corridor (near Tamachi Station) and Haneda by building a new tunnel between Tokyo Freight Terminal and the airport. In 2014, JR indicated that the line may be connected to the Ueno-Tokyo Line to allow through access to the Tohoku Main Line, and/or to the Rinkai Line for through service to the Saikyo Line and/or Keiyo Line. Although both JR and the Tokyo government have indicated that improved Haneda access is a high priority, JR has indicated that the connection and necessary line upgrades will take around ten years to complete and are unlikely to be completely ready for the 2020 Olympics.

== Route data ==
Distances:

- Tōkaidō Freight Branch Line (Hamamatsuchō Station - Tokyo Freight Terminal - Hama-Kawasaki Station): 20.6 km
- Nambu Branch Line (Hama-Kawasaki Station - Hatchonawate Station): 3.0 km
- Tōkaidō Freight Branch Line (Hatchōnawate Station - Tsurumi Station): 2.3 km
- Tōkaidō Freight Branch Line (Tsurumi Station - Yokohama Hazawa Freight Terminal - Higashi-Totsuka Station): 16.0 km
- Tōkaidō Line (Higashi-Totsuka Station - Odawara Station): 47.2 km
- Double track except for short links near the Nambu Line Branch

== History ==
- 20 December 1914: The line opens between Shiodome Freight Terminal and Shinagawa Station, reusing the 1872 alignment of the Tokyo-Yokohama Railway.
- 1 May 1918: The section between Kawasaki and Hama-Kawasaki (4.35 km) opens. Hama-Kawasaki Station opens.
- 21 June 1964: The line is electrified between Hama-Kawasaki and Shiohama Misao.
- 1966: JNR announces the construction of a dedicated freight line between Totsuka and Tsurumi, bypassing Yokohama Station. It generated howls of protest from residents.
- 1 October 1973: Tokyo Freight Terminal opens.
- 1 March 1976: The line between Tsurumi and Hama-Kawasaki (5.3 km) opens.
- 1 October 1979: The line between Tsurumi and Totsuka via Yokohama Hazawa (20.2 km) opens.
- 1 October 1980: The Hinkaku Line is also used for passengers, as the Tōkaidō Line and Yokosuka Line are separated, Higashi-Totsuka Station opens.
- 10 March 1990: Shiohama Misao Freight Terminal is renamed Kawasaki Freight Terminal.
- 1 October 1996: The line between Shinagawa and Hamamatsuchō (3.7 km) is closed.
- 30 January 1998: The line from Tokyo Freight Terminal to Hamamatsuchō Station is closed for construction of the Toei Ōedo Line subway.
