= Haneda Airport New Station =

Planned railway station in Tokyo, Japan

Haneda Airport New Station 羽田空港新駅
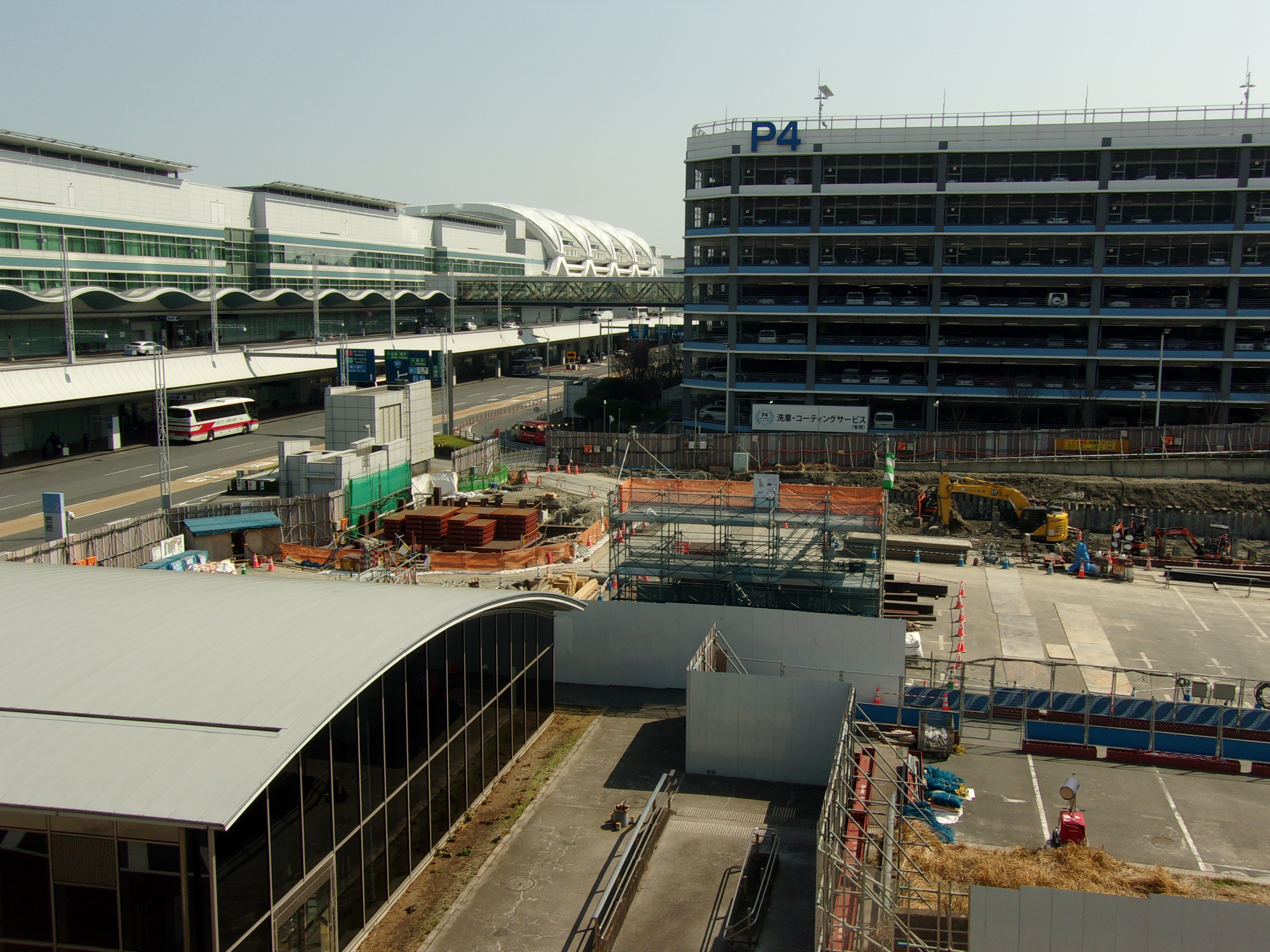
- Station under construction in March 2024

General information
- Location: Ōta, Tokyo; Japan
- Coordinates: 35°33′01″N 139°47′15″E
- Operator: JR East
- Line: Haneda Airport Access Line

Other information
- Status: Planned
Route map
Location
- Location within Japan

Haneda Airport New Station (Japanese: 羽田空港新駅, Hepburn: Haneda Kūkō Shin Eki) is a railway station scheduled to be built at Haneda Airport in Ōta, Tokyo, Japan, by the East Japan Railway Company (JR East). It is scheduled to open in 2029.

== Layout ==
The new station is planned to be located underground between and parallel to the domestic terminals (Terminal 1 and Terminal 2), and just north of and perpendicular to the existing Haneda Airport Terminal 1/2 Station on the Keikyu Airport Line, providing an expansion of the existing station. The station will be reached through a 1.9 kilometres (1.2 mi) shield tunnel underneath the airfield.

== Lines ==
Haneda Airport New Station will be served by the Haneda Airport Access Line.

Through service is planned to several regional JR lines, including the Utsunomiya Line, Takasaki Line, Joban Line, Saikyo Line, Rinkai Line, and Keiyo Line. Extensions of the Azusa and Kaiji limited express trains from Shinjuku to Haneda are also under consideration.
