= Shinji Sogō =

Japanese businessman

- 十河 信二
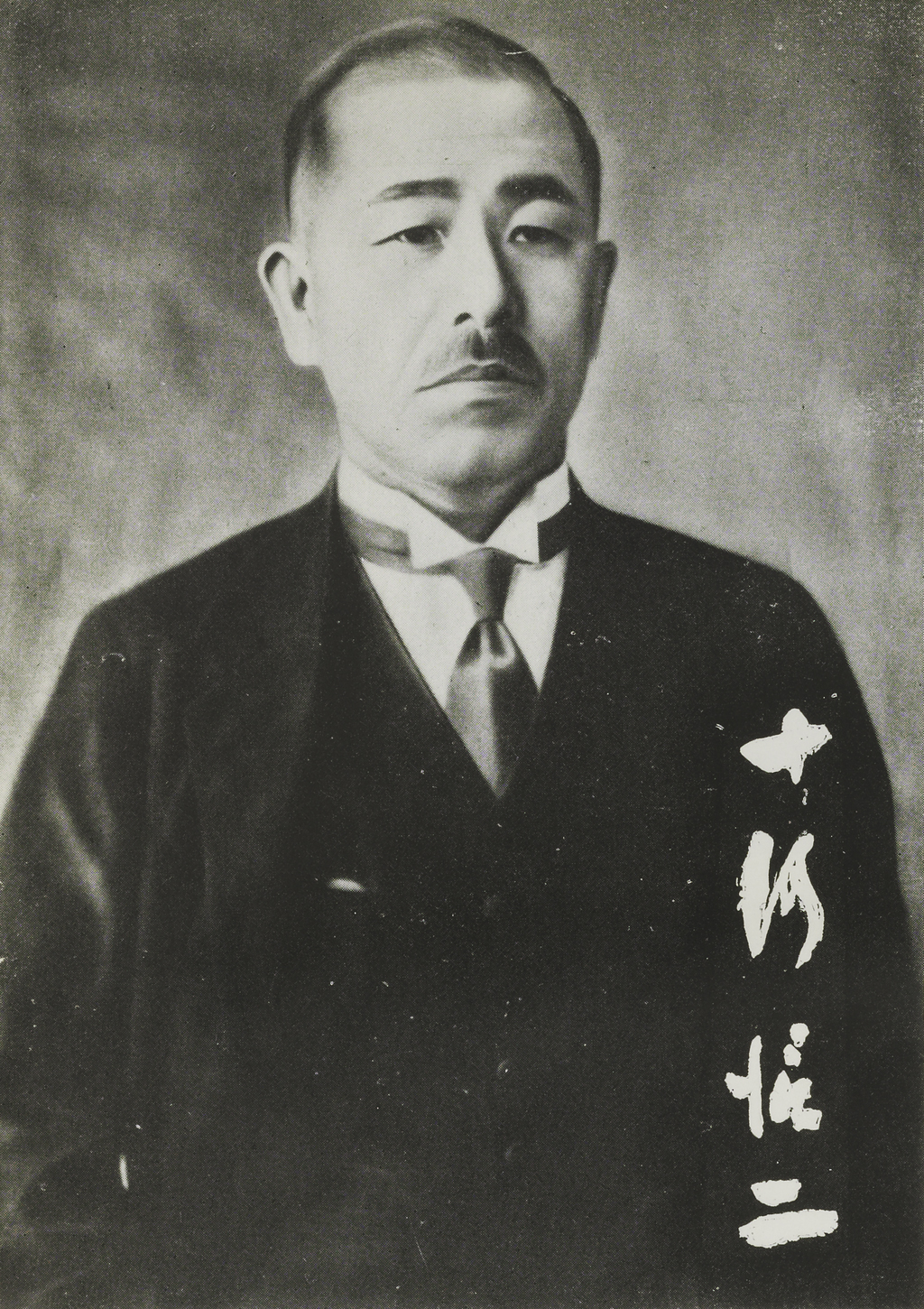
- Born: 14 April 1884; Niihama, Ehime, Japan
- Died: 3 October 1981 (aged 97); Shibuya, Tokyo, Japan
- Occupation(s): Bureaucrat, President of Japanese National Railways

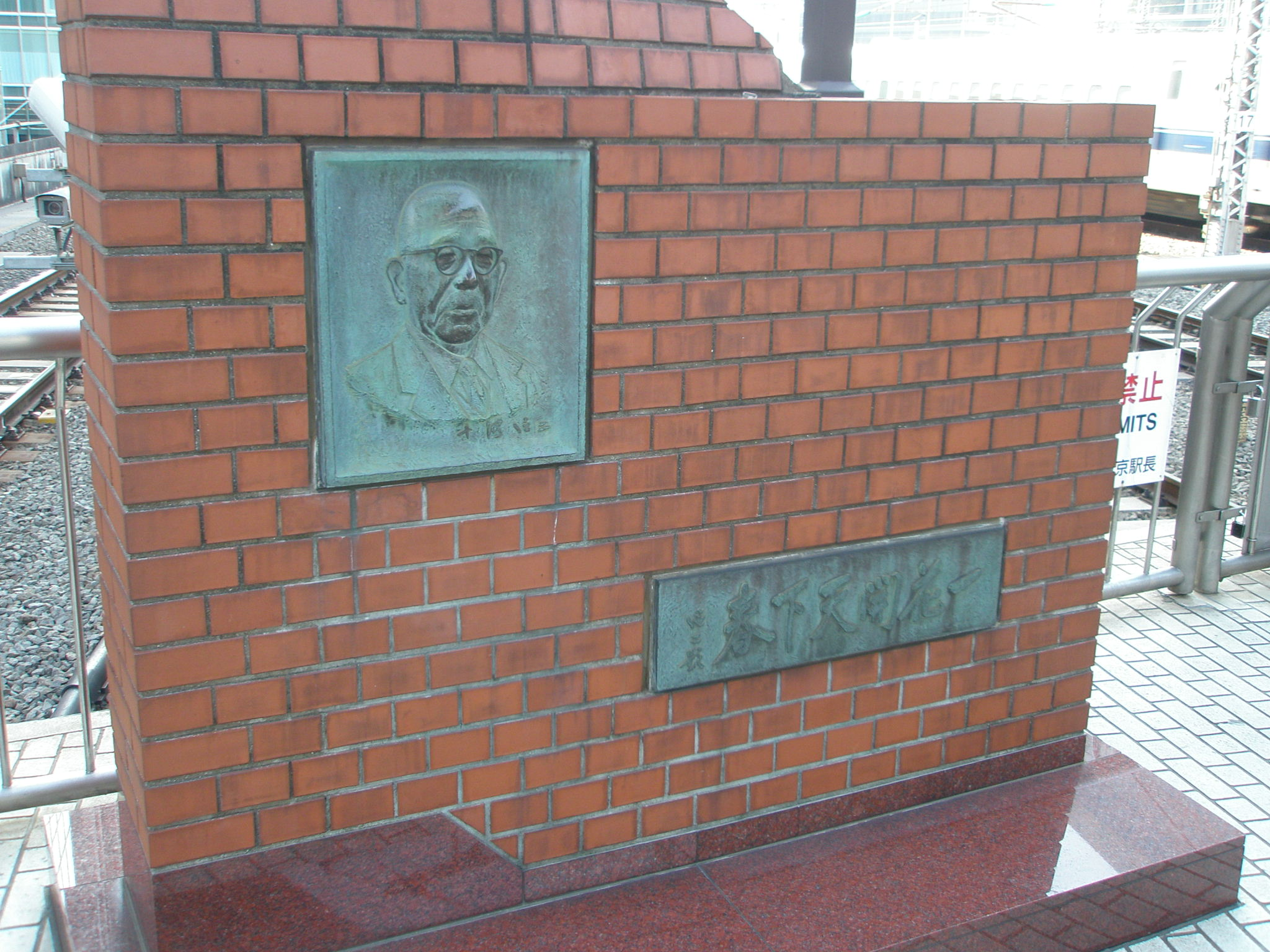
Monument to Shinji Sogō at Tokyo Station

Shinji Sogō (十河 信二, Sogō Shinji; 14 April 1884 – 3 October 1981) was the fourth president of the Japanese National Railways (JNR), and is credited with the creation of the first "bullet train", the Tōkaidō Shinkansen.

Born in Niihama, Ehime, Shikoku, in 1884, Shinji Sogo graduated from the Faculty of Law at Tokyo Imperial University in 1909, and joined the Railway Agency. While working for the Teito Reconstruction Agency after the Great Kantō earthquake of 1923, he was strongly influenced by Shinpei Gotō, the Agency president. After leaving the government railways in 1926, he became a director of the South Manchuria Railway. While at the South Manchuria Railway, he became closely connected with Kwantung Army officer Ishiwara Kanji, the key force behind the Manchurian Incident. Sogō acted as part of Ishiwara's "brain-trust" when Ishiwara was at the height of his power in 1936–1937. Sogō was part of Ishiwara's efforts to deny General Kazushige Ugaki the position of Prime Minister in January 1937, and install General Senjūrō Hayashi as Prime Minister. He helped Hayashi form his cabinet. Later that year his patron Ishiwara was forced out of power, and Sogō also lost his influence.

After World War II, he served as Chairman of the Railway Welfare Association until he was appointed JNR president in 1955.

== Influence on the Shinkansen ==
The decision to construct a standard-gauge Shinkansen at the end of the 1950s owed much to Shinji Sogō. To improve the existing Tōkaidō Main Line, he insisted on adopting standard gauge despite much opposition. He firmly believed that the international standard gauge was indispensable for radical improvement of Japanese railways—a view taken by Shinpei Gotō about 50 years earlier. This view was also shared by Hideo Shima who had been appointed by Sogō as the chief engineer of the Shinkansen project.

Sogō devised a plan to make it almost impossible for the government to withdraw its support, once given. Central to Sogo's strategy was the use of a loan from the International Bank of Reconstruction and Development (World Bank). This was apparently an idea put to him by future Prime Minister and then Minister of Finance, Eisaku Satō, who had previously worked with Sogō in the Railway Ministry. With the successful application for an $80 million loan (estimated to be no more than 15 percent of the cost of the line) in place, it ensured that the Japanese government had to remain committed to the project. At the same time, Sogō, who had kept estimated cost figures of the Tōkaidō Shinkansen deliberately low for fear that if they were too high neither the Japanese Government nor the World Bank would have supported the proposal, began to divert money from other JNR projects to the construction of the Shinkansen. This was possible because once JNR's total budget was approved by the Diet, the JNR president had "discretionary authority" over how to spend it. Sogo also kept down the declared maximum proposed speed at a relatively modest 200 km/h and argued successfully that this was not a new line but expansion of the existing Tōkaidō Line.

When the budget diversion became a political issue, he resigned in 1963, taking full responsibility for the decision. However, much of the credit for the Tōkaidō Shinkansen goes to him.

In 1965, a year after the inaugural run, Sogo was decorated by Emperor Hirohito with the Grand Cordon of the Order of the Sacred Treasure, an award recognizing his extraordinary service to Japan.

A plaque commemorating Shinji Sogō was installed on platforms 18/19 at Tokyo Station.
