= Lüshun Port =

Naval station in Dalian, China

Lüshun Port 旅顺港 Port Arthur, Ryojun
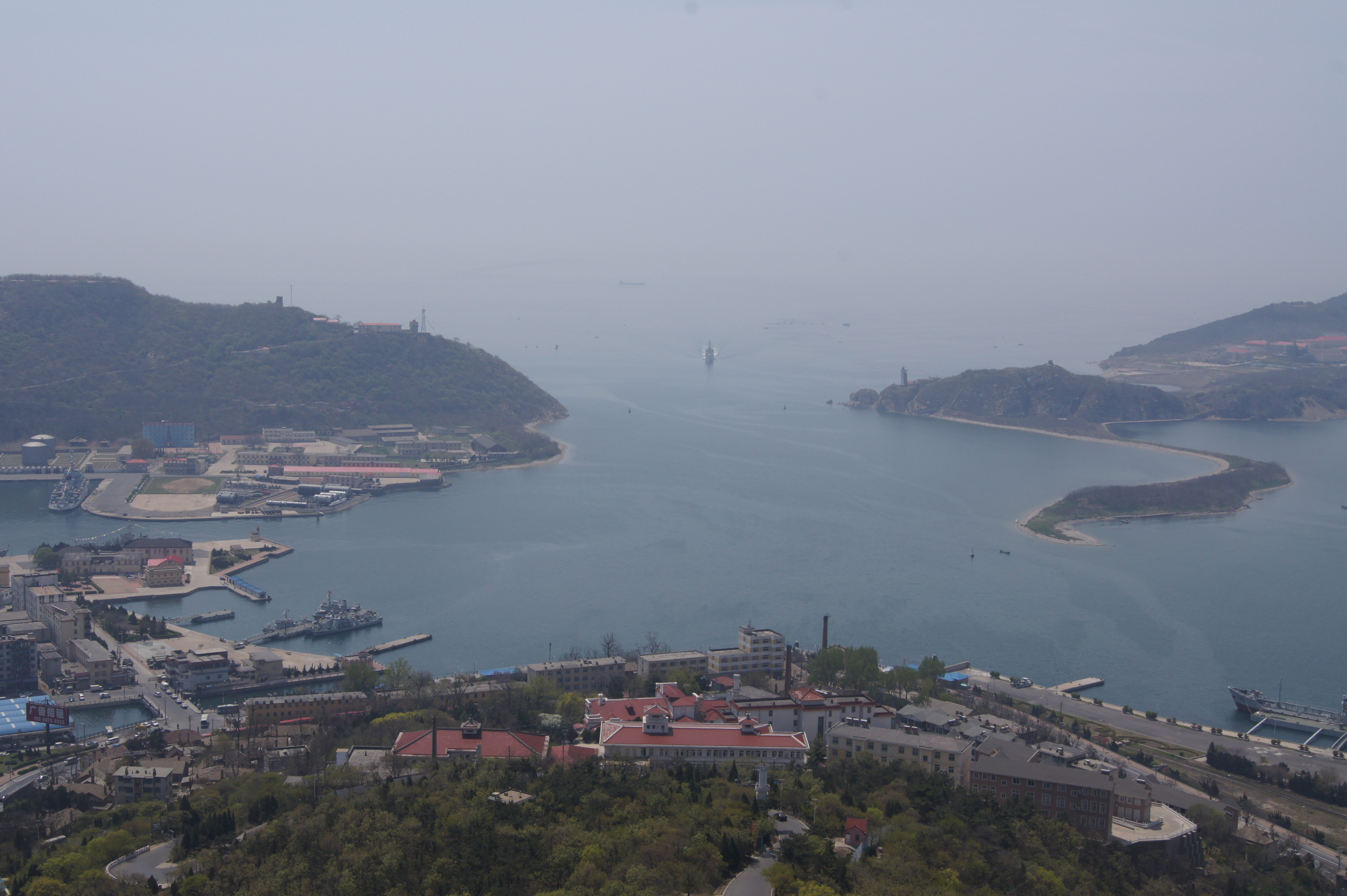
- Interactive map of Lüshun Port
- Coordinates: 38°47′0″N 121°15′0″E
- Country: China
- Province: Liaoning
- District: Lüshunkou

Lüshun Port (Chinese: 旅顺港; pinyin: Lǚshùn gǎng), formerly Port Arthur (Russian: Порт-Артур, romanized: Port-Artur) is either Lüshun Naval Port (Chinese: 旅顺军港) for military use or the New Lüshun Port (Chinese: 旅顺新港) for commercial use, both in Lüshunkou District, Dalian, Liaoning province, China.

It is now home to the People's Liberation Army Navy's (PLAN) Liaonan Shipyard, in operation since 1883.

The control of Lüshun Naval Base changed several times in the first half of the 20th century: from China to the Russian Empire from 1895 to 1904, then after the Russo-Japanese War to the Empire of Japan from 1905 to 1945, then following the Soviet invasion of Manchuria in the closing days of World War II in China to the occupying Soviet Union from 1945 to 1956, and then finally back to China in 1956.

== History ==
=== Early history ===
Among the earliest accounts of a settlement in the region date back to the Jin Dynasty, when it bore the name of Mashijin (Chinese: 马石津). Before acquiring its present name, it was named Doulizhen (Chinese: 都里镇) under the Tang Dynasty and Shizikou (Chinese: 狮子口) under the Mongol Yuan Dynasty, the latter translated literally as "Lion's jaw", supposedly due to a statue, now located in a park, adjacent to the military port.

It received the name "Lüshun" under the Ming Dynasty, when, in 1371, future Emperor of China, Zhu Di, was commanding frontier defence and sent two envoys to the area to familiarize themselves with the terrain. Because the journey was calm and comfortable (Chinese: 旅途顺利, lu shunli), he ordered the region to be named Lüshunkou, literally meaning "bay of calm travels".

=== 19th century ===
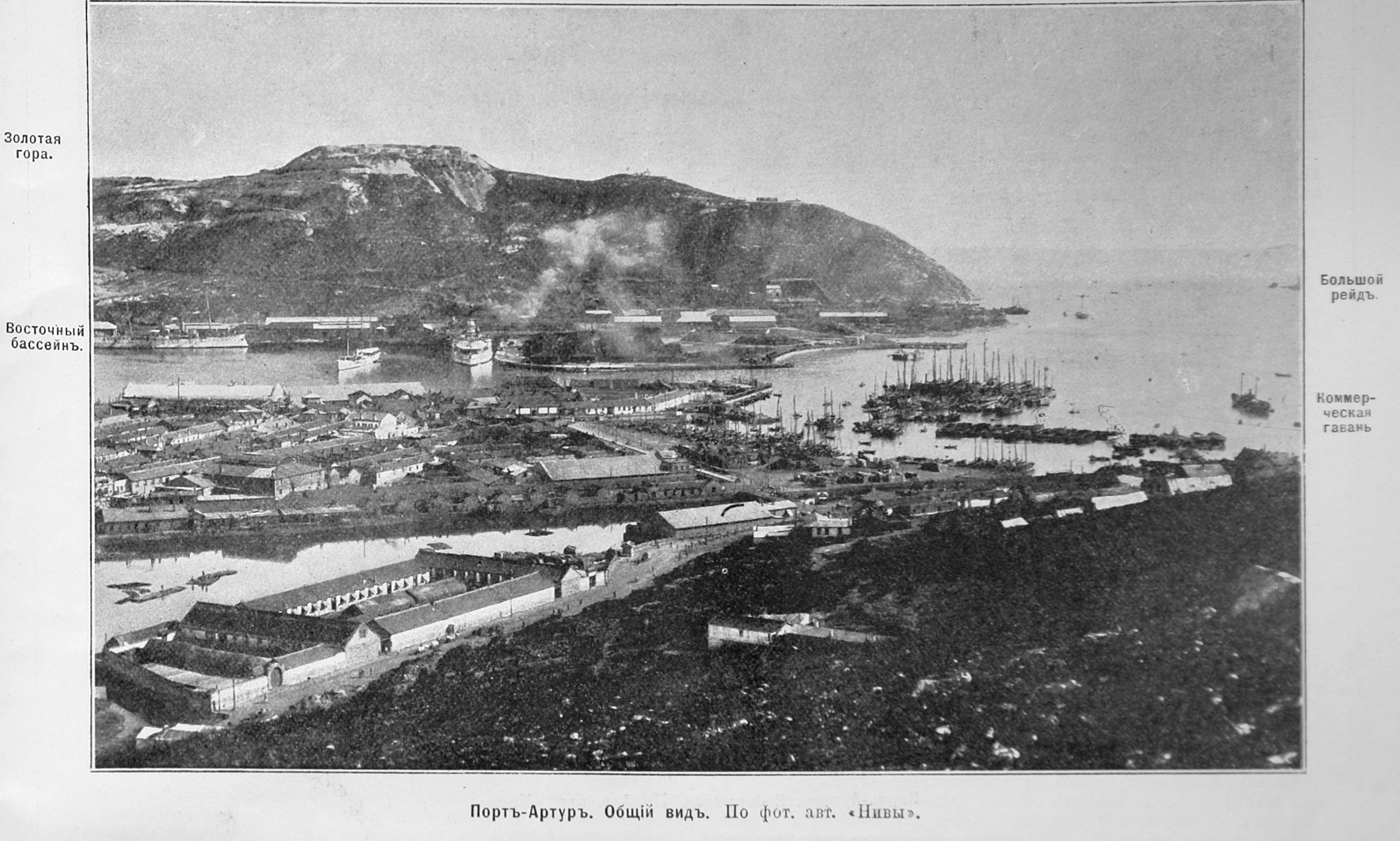
Entering Lüshun Port from the Yellow Sea (left), a 1904 photo

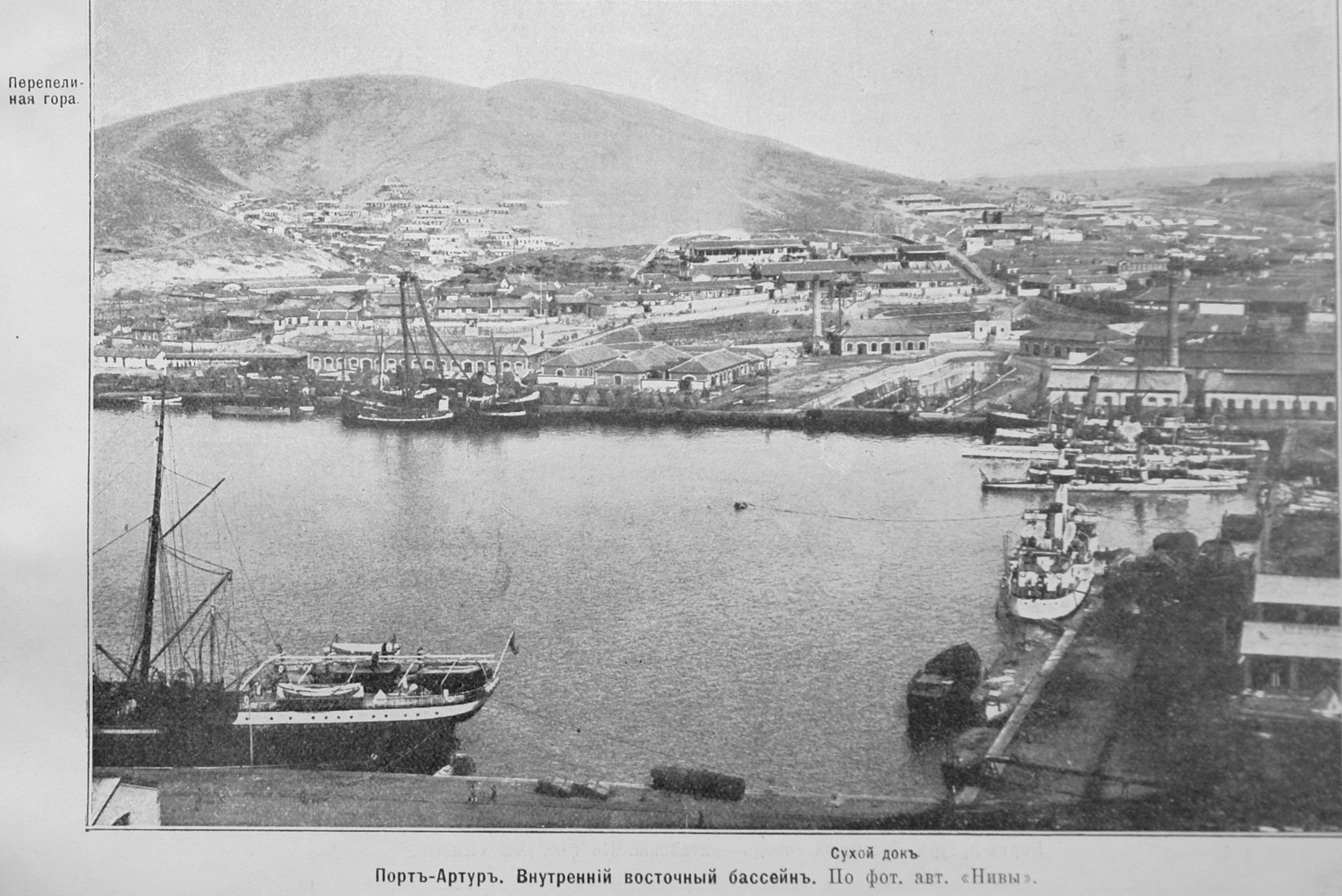
Port Arthur. The inner eastern basin. Photo from the magazine Niva, 1904.

There are several theories as to how the name "Port Arthur" came to be. One claims that, in August 1860, in its bay the vessel of British lieutenant William Arthur was being repaired, and thusly was named in his honour. Alternatively, another version affirms that the Chinese settlement of Lüshun was renamed in honour of the third son of Queen Victoria, Prince Arthur, who was 10 years old at the time. The English name was later adopted by Russia, and other European nations.

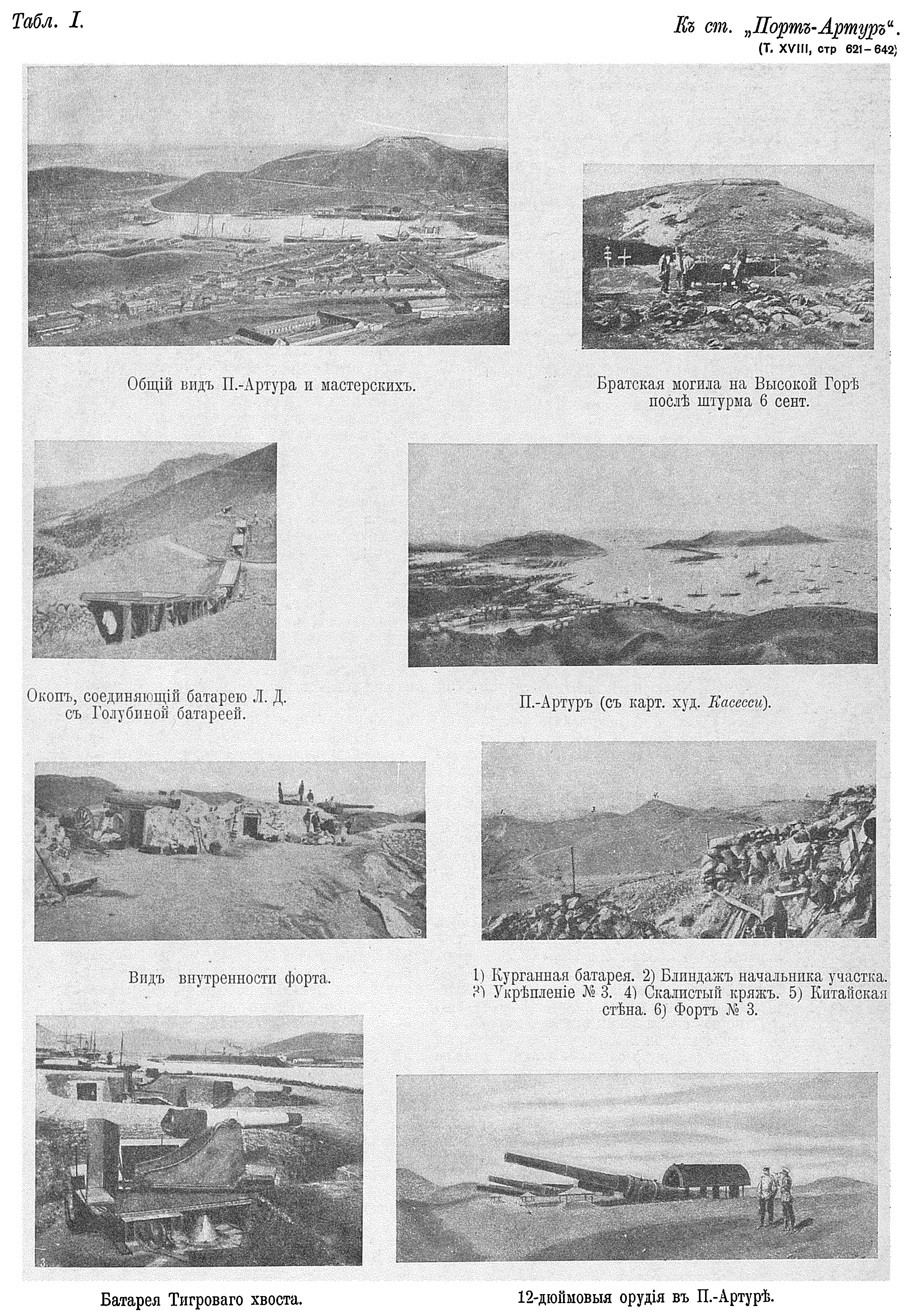
Photos from the article "Port Arthur" of Sytin's Military Encyclopaedia

The construction of a naval base in the strategically significant bay of Lüshun began in the 1880s under the supervision of statesman Li Hongzhang and the Chinese government. In 1884, to guard the coast from a possible landing of French troops, a detachment of the Chinese army was stationed, while the crew of the military vessel Weiyuan, on orders of its commander, Fan Boqian, constructed one of the first coastal batteries, named Weiyuan Fort.

In the period from 1884 to 1889, Lüshun became one of the naval bases of the Qing Empire's Beiyang Fleet. The construction of the fortifications was supervised by German Major Constantin von Gunneken. Additionally, Lüshun housed the main repair facilities of the Beiyang Fleet — a 400-foot (120 m) dock for repairing battleships and cruisers, and a smaller dock for repairing destroyers. Dredging of the bay brought the depth of the inner roadstead and bay entrance to 20 feet (6.1 m).

On 21 November 1894, during the First Sino-Japanese War, the region fell to Japanese troops, due to the complete collapse of the defence system and the desertion of the commander, General Jiang Guichi, as well as the prohibition of the Beiyang Fleet by the government and Li Hongzhang personally to engage the more powerful Japanese fleet in the outer reaches of Lüshun. The remnants of the garrison under General Xu Bandao broke through and linked up with the main forces of General Sun Qing, commander-in-chief of the Chinese forces in Manchuria.

Lüshun was occupied by Japan, capturing a great amount of trophy equipment. Japanese troops executed a ruthless 4-day-long massacre under the justification that the remains of Japanese POWs were found within the settlement. According to Chinese sources, up to 20,000 civilians and military personnel were killed. Out of the entire population of the town, according to Frederick Villiers, only 36 people were left to bury the bodies of the dead. On their hats, by order of the Japanese command, "These are not to be killed" was written. The collection of bodies continued for a month, after which, by order of the Japanese, the huge mountain of bodies was doused with oil and set on fire, keeping the fire burning for 10 days. The ashes and burnt bones were buried at the foot of Mount Baiyushan in 4 large coffins on the eastern side of the mountain. The site is now known as the "Tomb of the 10,000 who remained faithful".

In 1895, Port Arthur was transferred to Japan according to the Treaty of Shimonoseki. However, due to strong pressure from the Russian Empire, German Empire and France (Triple Intervention), Japan was forced to relinquish the naval base and return it to China.

=== Under Russian control ===
Port Arthur, 1904
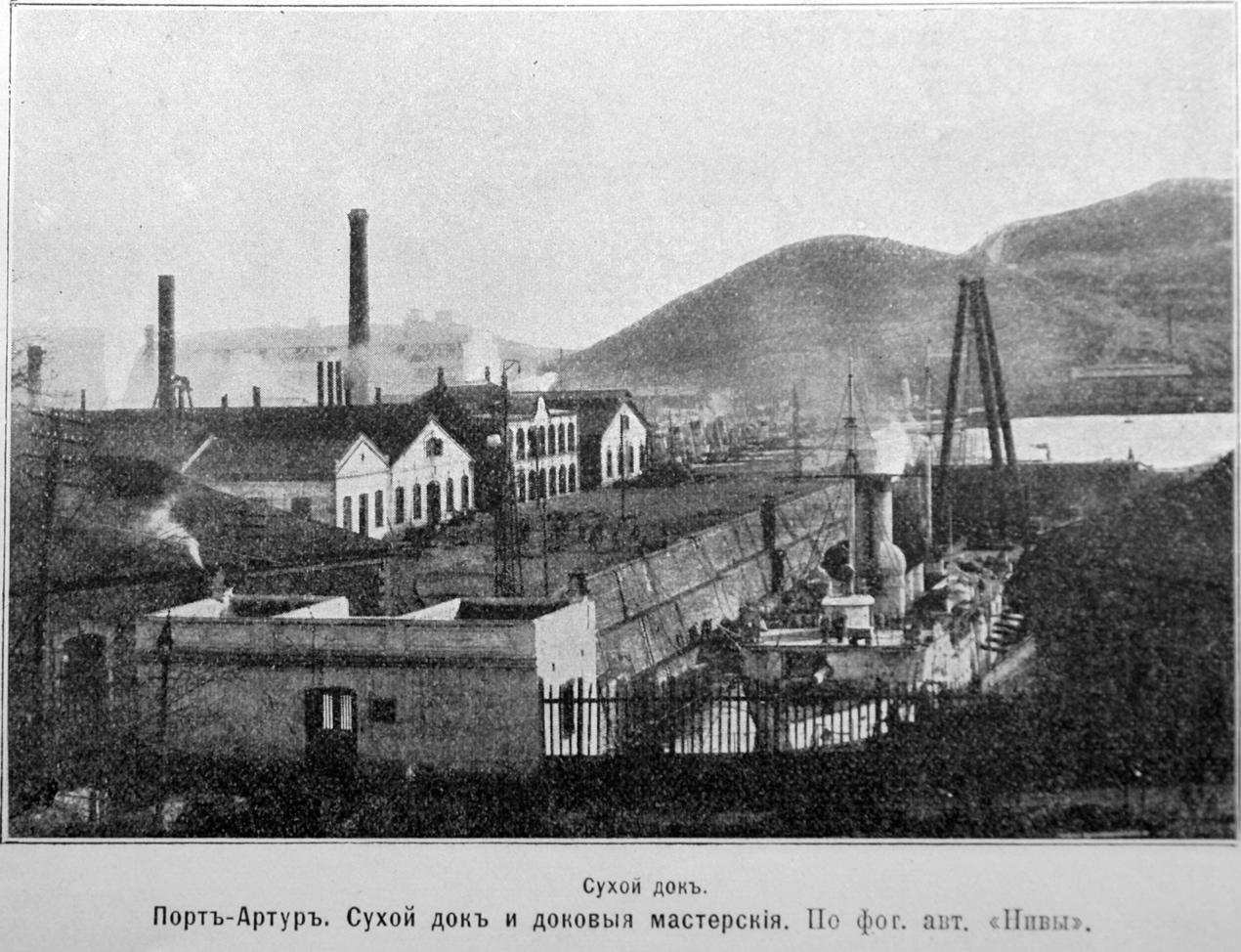
Dry dock and dock workshop

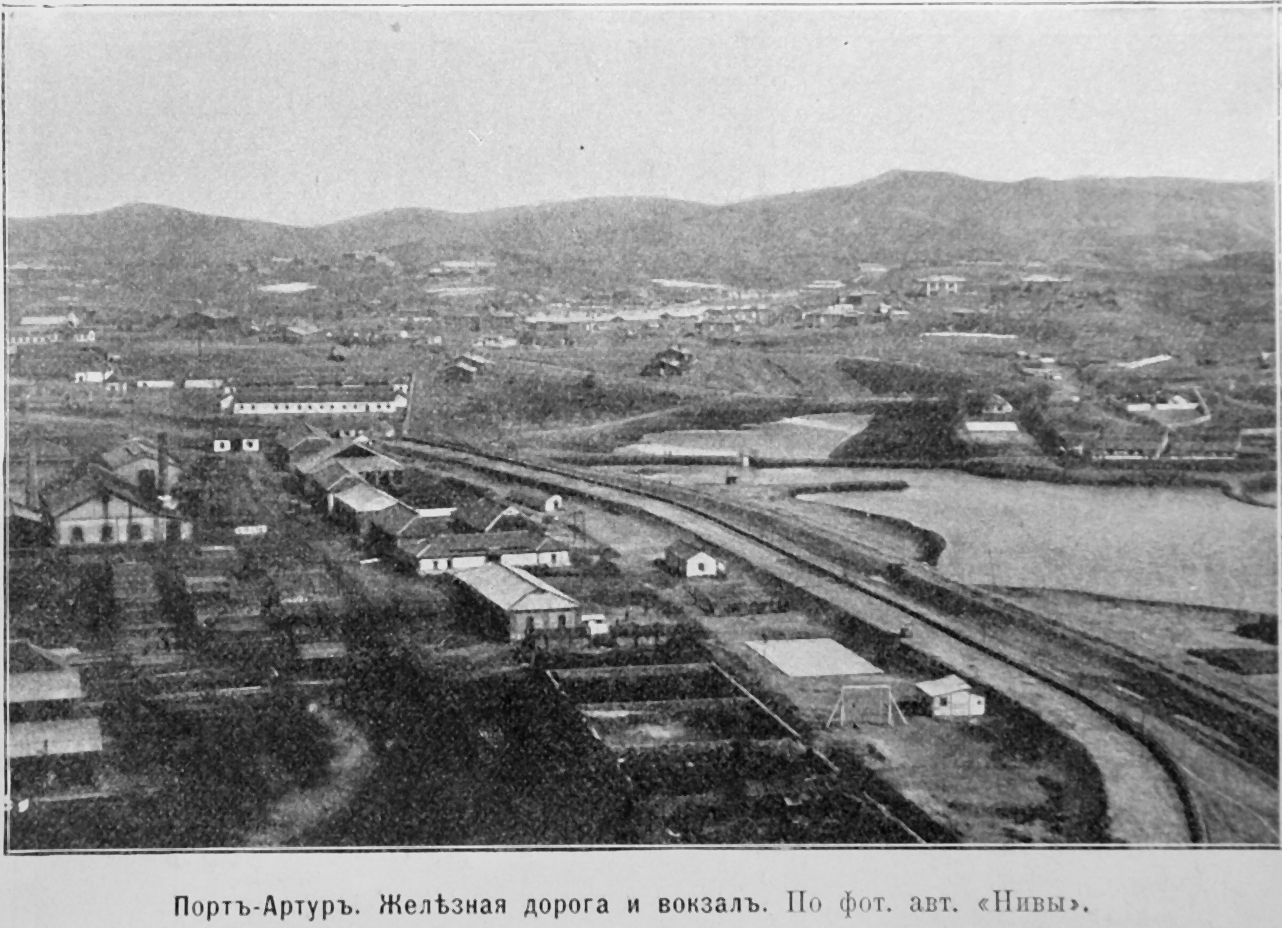
A railway and a railway station

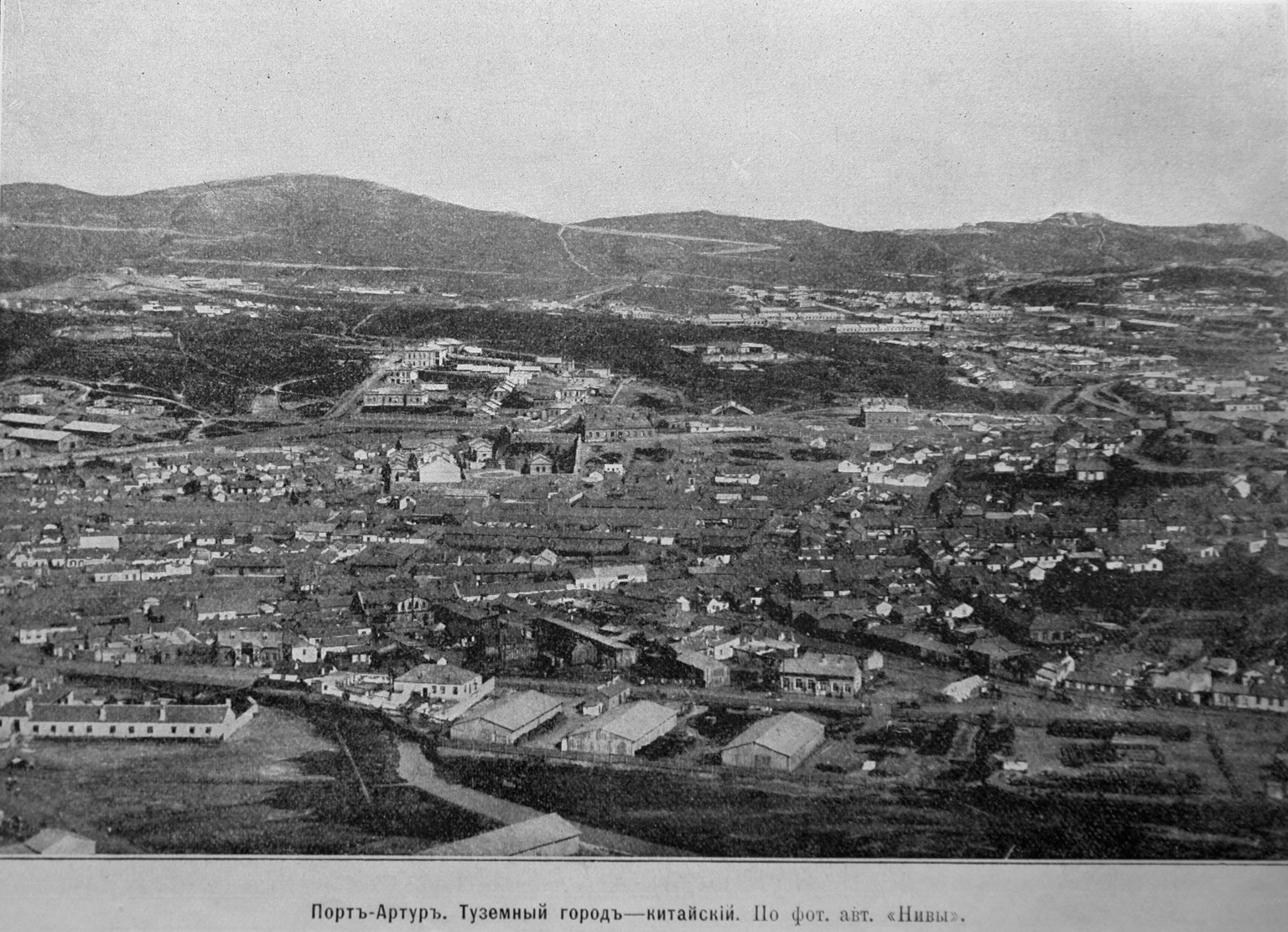
Chinese districts

In November 1897, the Russian cabinet discussed a note by Count Muravyov (Minister of Foreign Affairs) proposing to occupy Port Arthur or nearby Talienwan (known currently as Dalian Bay), using as a convenient pretext the fact that the Germans had occupied the Chinese port of Qingdao. At this meeting, Muravyov stated that he considered it "very timely, as it would be desirable for Russia to have a port on the Pacific Ocean in the Far East, and these ports [...] by their strategic position are places of enormous importance".

Sergei Witte protested against such a proposal: after the Russian-Chinese secret defence treaties in which "we [Russian Empire] undertook to defend China against any attempt by Japan to occupy any part of Chinese territory [...] after all this, such a seizure would be an outrageous and highly treacherous measure [...] The occupation of Port Arthur or Talienwan would certainly excite China and turn a country that is extremely favourable and friendly to us into a country that hates us because of our treachery".

Count Muravyov's proposal was then rejected, but "a few days after the meeting [...] The Sovereign Emperor, apparently a little embarrassed, said to me [Sergei Witte] [...]: 'But you know, Sergei Yulyevich, I have decided to take Port Arthur and Talienwan and have already sent our flotilla there with a military force', and added: 'I have done this because the Minister of Foreign Affairs reported to me after the meeting that, according to his information, English ships are cruising in the areas near Port Arthur and Talienwan and that, if we do not seize these ports, they will be seized by the English'".

It was first announced to the Chinese that Russian ships with troops "came to defend China from the Germans and as soon as the Germans leave, we [Russian contingent] will leave... But soon the Chinese government learnt from its ambassador in Berlin that we were acting in agreement with Germany, they began to treat us with extreme distrust". The Chinese government at first did not agree to the transfer of the Guandong region to Russia, but had no power to prevent it.

Here is what A. V. Shishov writes in his book:

Simultaneously, Russia solved the problem of an ice-free naval base, which was an urgent necessity in the military confrontation with Japan. In December 1897, the Russian squadron entered Port Arthur. Negotiations concerning its seizure were conducted in tandem in Peking (at the diplomatic level) and in Port Arthur itself. Here the commander of the squadron of the Pacific, Rear Admiral Dubasov, under the "cover" of 12-inch guns battleships Sisoy Veliky and Navarin and the guns of the cruiser of the 1st rank Rossiya held brief talks with the chief of the local fortress garrison generals Song Qing and Ma Yuikun.

Dubasov quickly resolved the problem of the landing of Russian troops in Port Arthur and the departure from there of the Chinese garrison. After distributing bribes to small officials, General Song Qing received 100 thousand rubles, and General Ma Yuikun — 50 thousand (not in banknotes, of course, but in gold and silver coin). The local 20,000-strong garrison then left the fortress in less than 24 hours, leaving the Russians with 59 guns along with ammunition. Some of them would later be used for the defence of Port Arthur.

The first Russian military units came ashore from the Voluntary Fleet steamer Saratov, which arrived from Vladivostok. They were two hundred Transbaikal Cossacks, a division of field artillery and a team of fortress artillery.

The All-Russian Emperor Nicholas II issued the following order on such an occasion:

"The Sovereign Emperor declares his Highest gratitude to Vice-Admiral Dubasov, Commander of the squadron in the Pacific, and the Monarch's favour to all the ranks of the squadron and land detachment entrusted to him for the excellent fulfilment of the commissions entrusted to him for the occupation of Port Arthur and Talienwan".

— A. V. Shishov,

After large bribes to local dignitaries (500,000 rubles to Li Hongzhang and 250,000 rubles to Chang Yinghuan), the Convention for the Lease of the Liaotung Peninsula was signed on 27 March 1898 in Beijing. The port, together with the adjacent Guandong Peninsula, was leased to Russia for 25 years. The peninsula with the adjacent islands later formed the Kwantung Oblast and in 1903 together with the Priamurye Governorate-General became a part of the Far Eastern Viceroyalty.

It intended to turn Port Arthur into the second naval base of the Russian Pacific Fleet, along with Vladivostok. The construction of the fortress began in 1901 according to the project of military engineer K. Velichko.

By 1904, about 20% of the total volume of works had been completed. Admiral Stark's 1st Pacific Squadron (7 battleships, 9 cruisers, 24 destroyers, 4 gunboats and other vessels) was based in the port. The Port Arthur Fortress Infantry Regiment, formed on 27 June 1900 with 4 battalions from troops of European Russia, under the command of Colonel Alexander Karlovich Sellinen (appointed on 18 December 1900) was also stationed in the fortress.

On 6 December 1902 Nikolay Romanovich Greve was appointed commander of the port Arthur, in 1904 he was succeeded by Ivan Grigorovich.

==== Siege of Port Arthur ====
Port Arthur, 1904
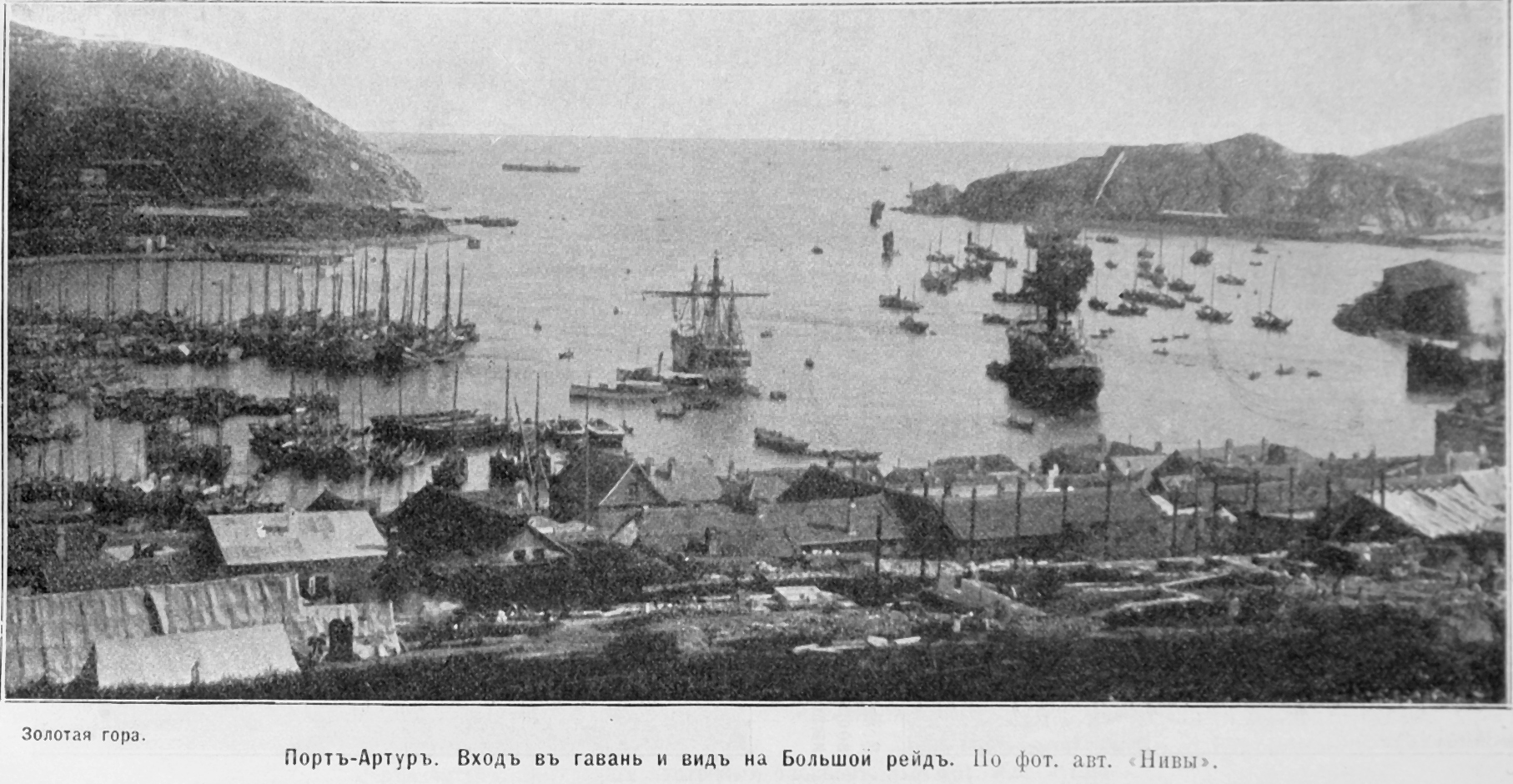
The harbour entrance and view of the roadstead.

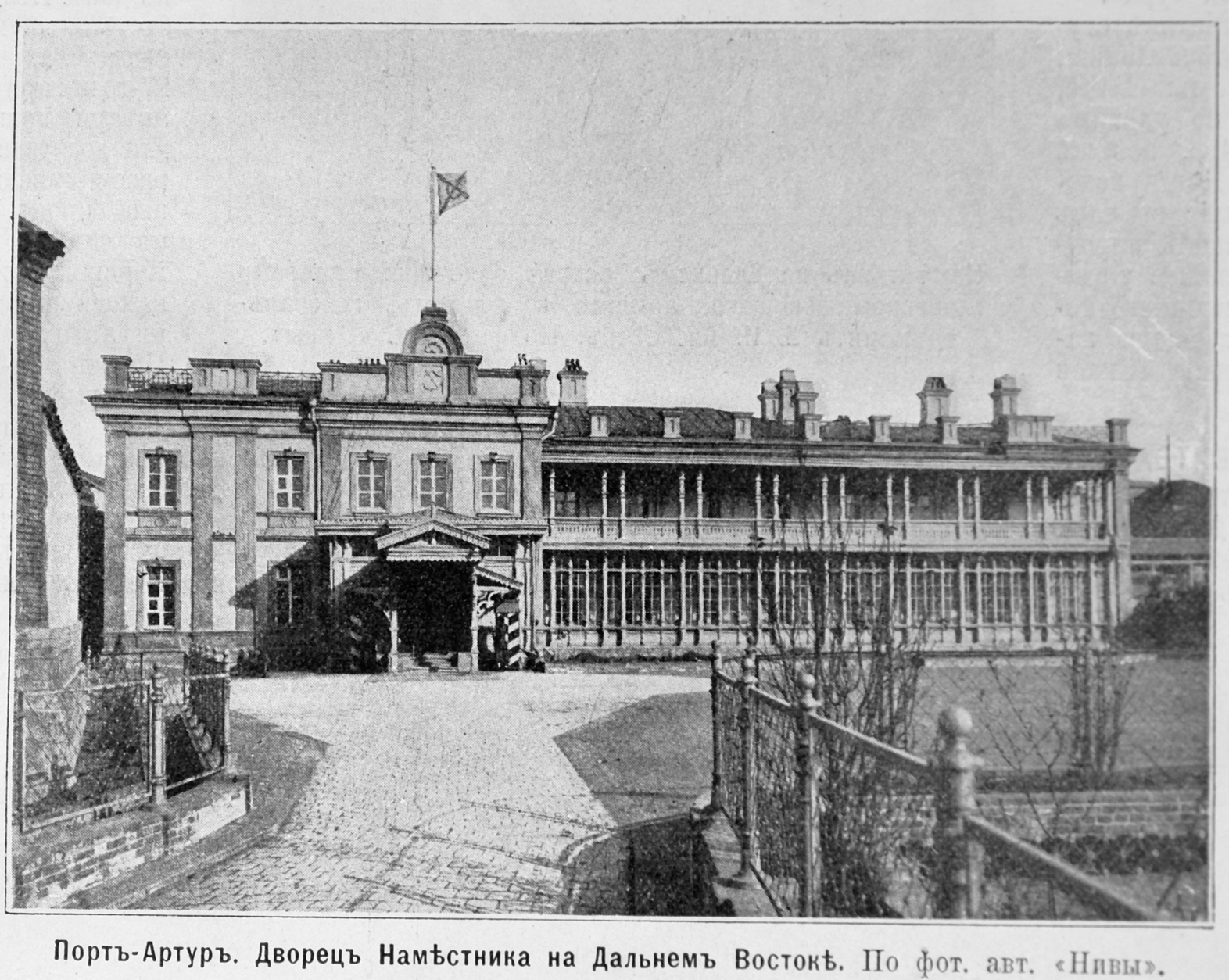
Palace of the Viceroy in the Far East.

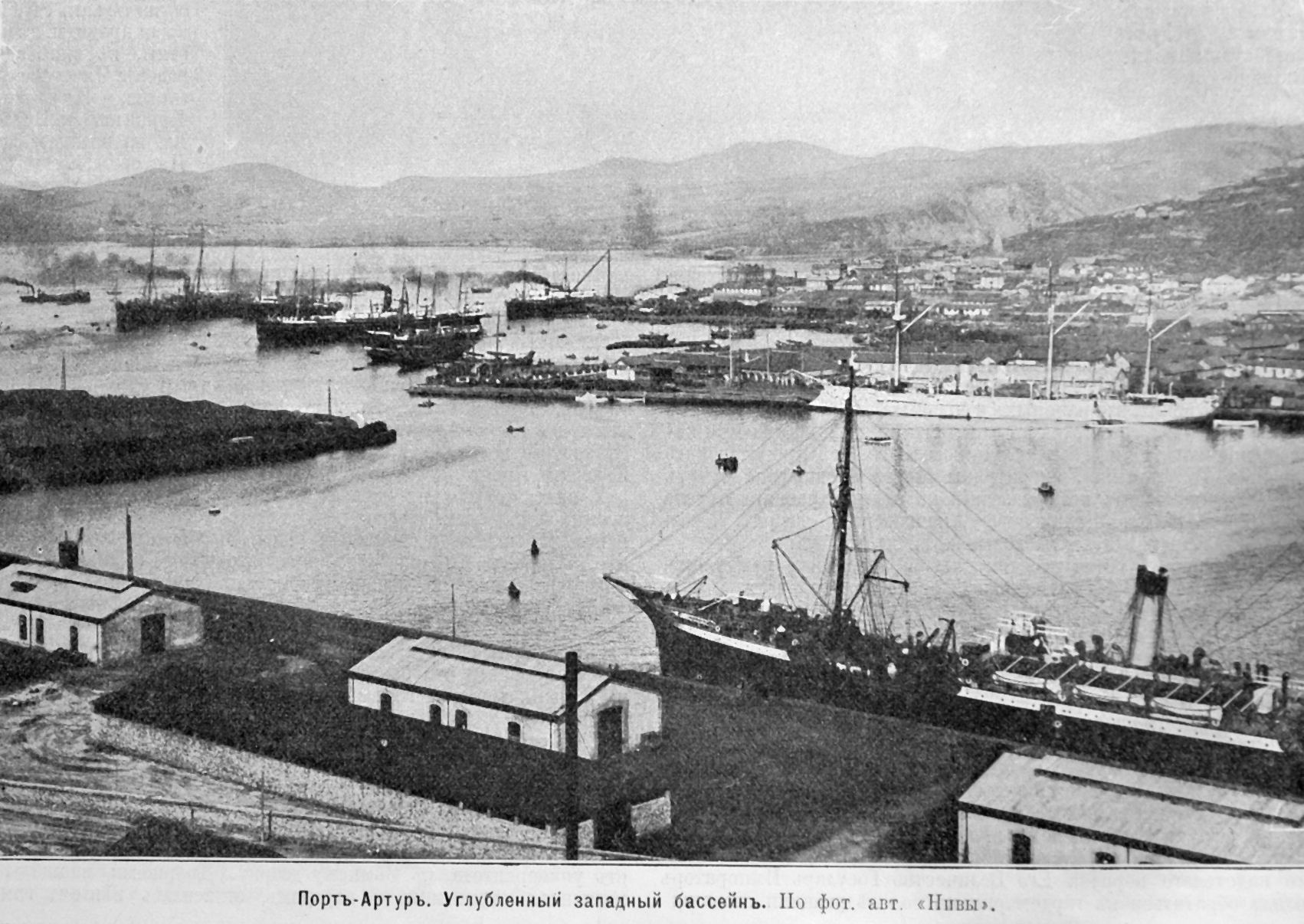
The deepened western basin.

Near Port Arthur, on the night of 27 January 1904, the first fighting of the Russo-Japanese War began when Japanese ships fired torpedoes at Russian warships on the outer roadstead. The ironclads Retvizan and Tsesarevich, as well as the cruiser Pallada were seriously damaged. The remaining ships made two attempts to break out of port, but both were unsuccessful. The Japanese attack was carried out without a declaration of war and was condemned by most of the international community. Only Britain, Japan's ally at the time, celebrated the attack as a "great deed".

During the war, the Japanese Army under General Nogi Maresuke, supported by the Japanese Navy under Admiral Togo, began a siege of the fortress of Port Arthur that lasted 11 months. The Japanese used the most modern, 280 mm howitzers.

On 2 January 1905, after the death of General Roman Kondratenko, the fortress was surrendered to the Japanese on the 329th day after the outbreak of war by General Anatoly Stessel, against the decision of the Military Council and the wishes of the soldiers defending the fortress.

=== Under Japanese control ===
After the end of the Russo-Japanese War, the 1905 Portsmouth Peace Treaty ceded the lease rights to Port Arthur and the entire Liaotung Peninsula to Japan. Later, Japan pressured China and forced the latter to extend the lease. In 1932, the city formally became part of Manchukuo, but de facto continued to be governed by Japan (officially, Japan was considered to be leasing the Guandong region from Manchukuo). Under Japanese rule, the name of the city was written in the same characters, but they were now read in Japanese: Ryojun (Japanese: 旅順).

=== Under Soviet control ===
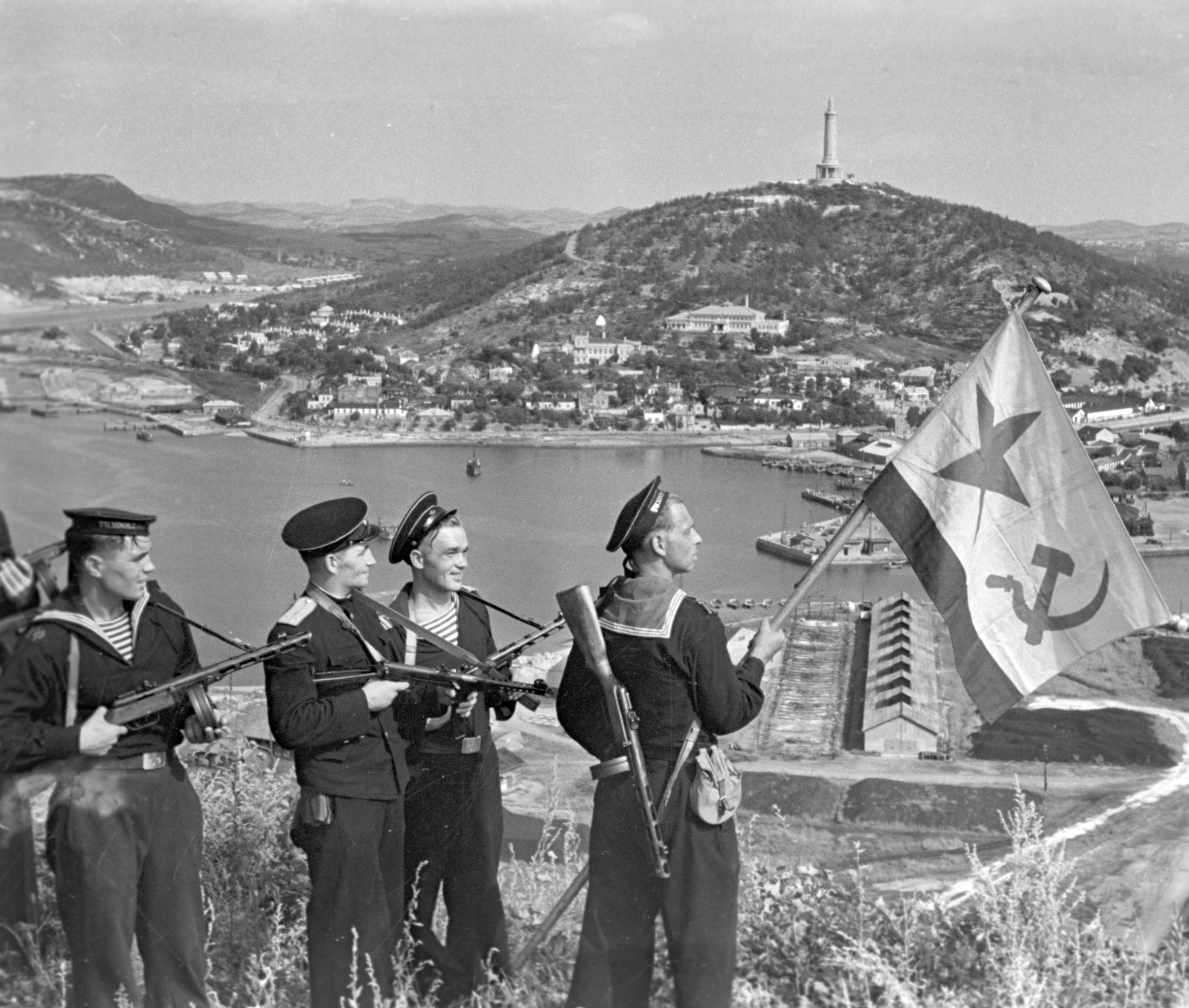
Hoisting the Soviet Naval Flag Over Lüshun Naval Port, a 1945 photo

During the Soviet–Japanese War of 1945, Soviet troops cleared the city of Japanese military formations by landing on 22 August 1945. On 14 August 1945, the USSR and the Republic of China signed an agreement on the use of the Port Arthur area as a joint naval base for 30 years.

Stalin considered the treaty made with Chiang Kai-shek to be unequal, and in the late 1940s proposed to Mao Zedong that Port Arthur as well as the Dalian and Chinese Eastern Railway be handed back to China, but Mao feared that a Soviet withdrawal from Manchuria would jeopardise the CCP's position in northeast China, and persuaded Stalin to postpone the transfer.

On 14 February 1950, simultaneously with the signing of the Sino-Soviet Treaty of Friendship, Alliance and Mutual Assistance, an agreement on Port Arthur was formalized, providing for the joint use of said base by the USSR and the PRC until the end of 1952.

At the end of 1952, the PRC government, assessing the escalation of the situation in the Far East, approached the Soviet government with a proposal to extend the stay of Soviet troops in Port Arthur. An agreement on this issue was ratified on 15 September 1952.

On 12 October 1954, the Soviet and PRC governments concluded an agreement that Soviet military units would withdraw from Port Arthur. The withdrawal of Soviet troops and the transfer of facilities to the PRC government was completed in May 1955.

=== Under PRC control ===
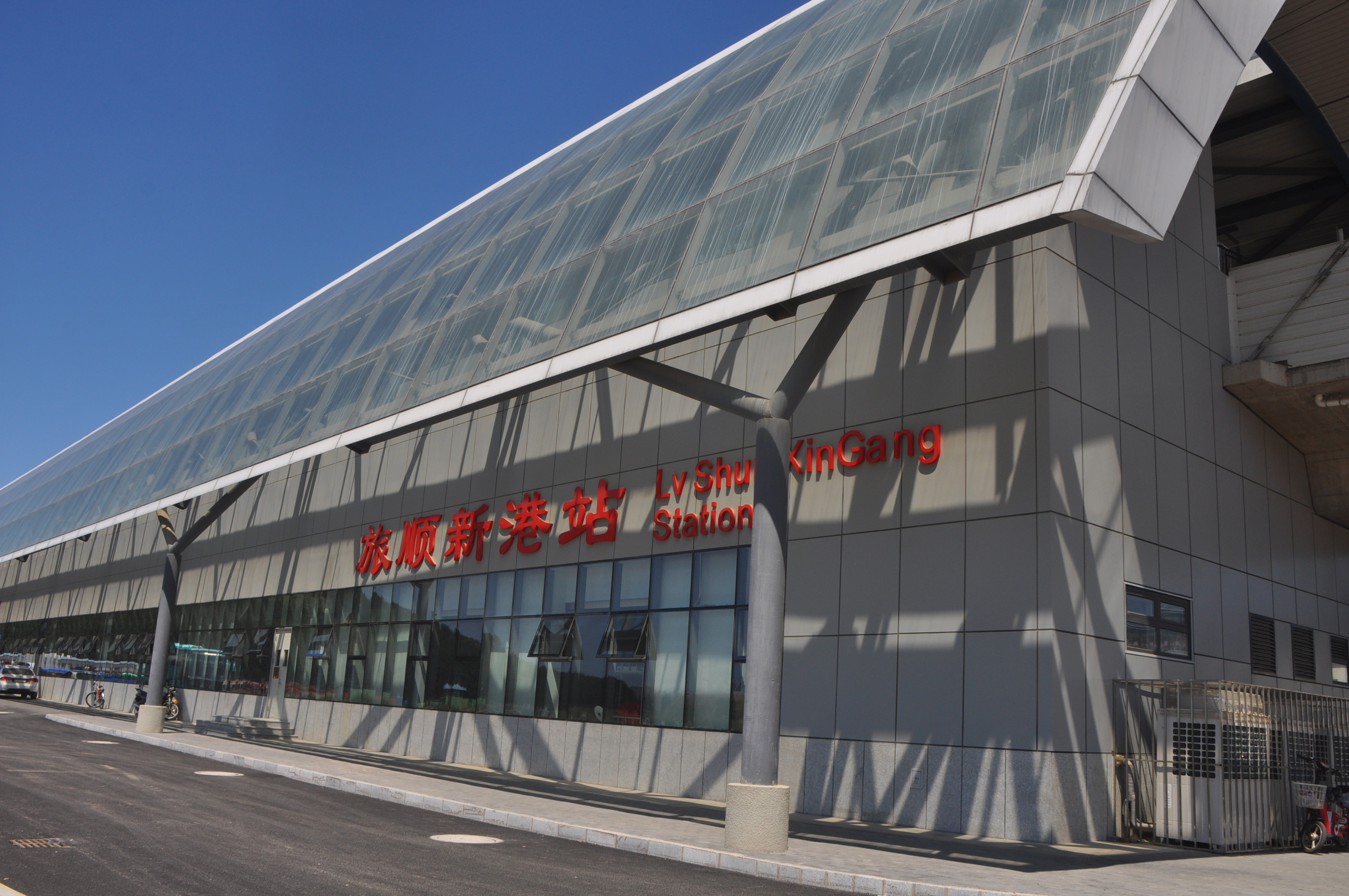
New Lüshun Port Station of Dalian's 202 Extension Line (2014)

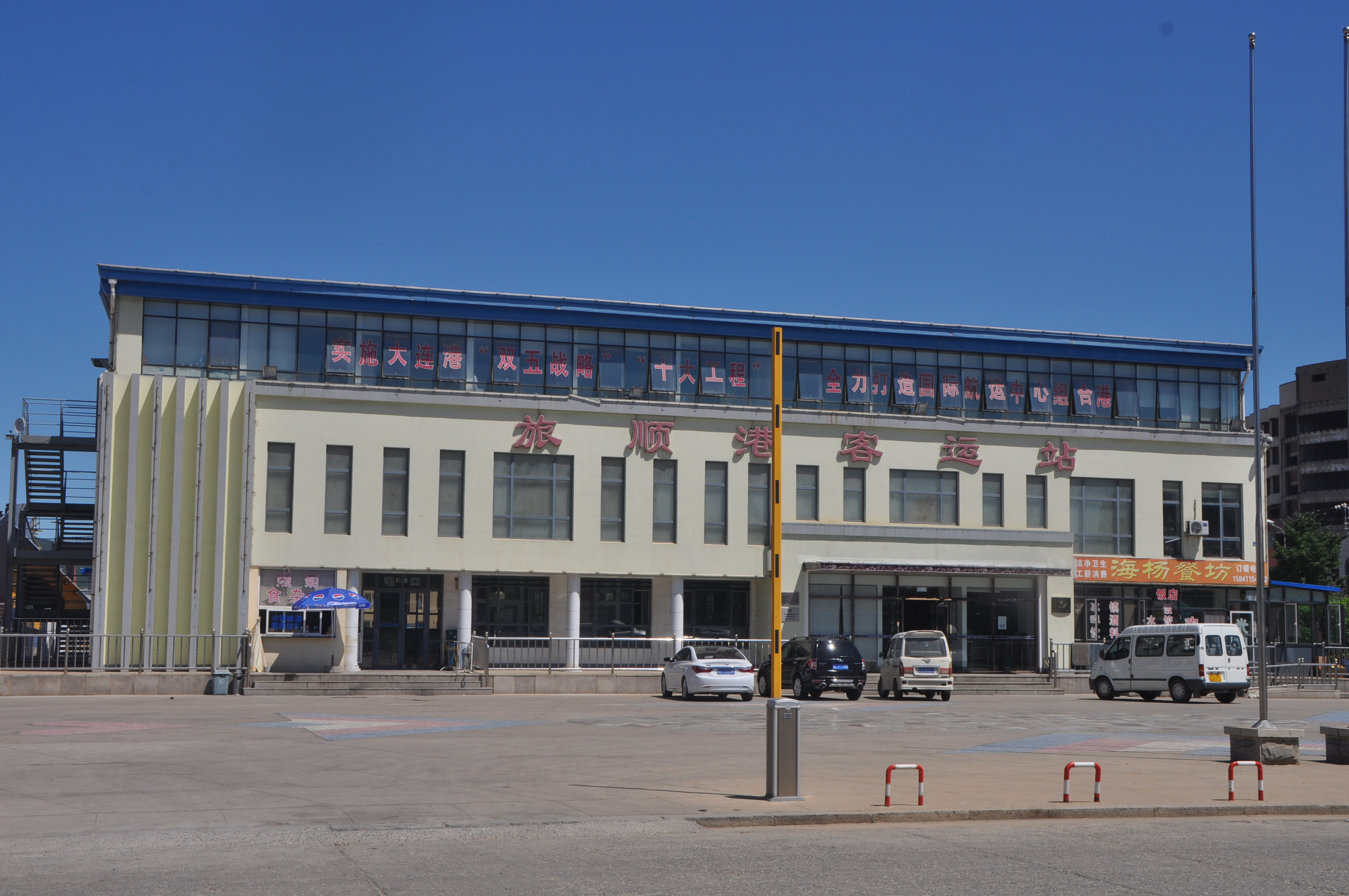
New Lushun Port's Waiting Room Building, Across the Street from New Lüshun Port Station (2014)

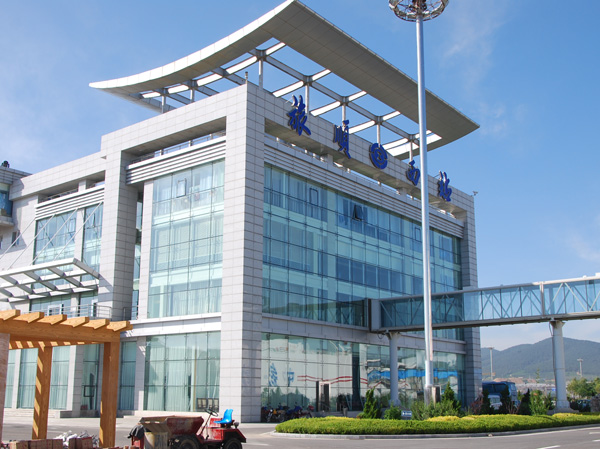
From the waiting room of Lüshun West Station, a pedestrian overpass leads to the Bohai Train Ferry (2009).

==== Lüshun Naval Base ====
Lüshun Naval Base (38.802°N 121.266°E) was established during the 1880s for Beiyang Fleet of the Qing dynasty, together with the headquarters at Weihaiwei. It is located to the south of the central part of Lüshun, in the bay of Lüshun.

Nearby is Lüshun Railway Station of the Lüshun Branch Line (Chinese: 旅顺支线) of Chinese Eastern Railway.

==== New Lüshun Port ====
New Lüshun Port (38.817°N 121.135°E) was established from the late 20th century to the early 21st century as Lüshun's economy started to thrive. It is located to the west of central Lüshun, and to the east of Bay of Yangtouwa (Chinese: 羊头洼港). There is Lüshun West Station of the freight railway line from the Lüshun Branch Line, for the Bohai Train Ferry.

New Lüshun Port Station of the extension of Dalian's 202 railway is located nearby.

== See also ==
- Dalian Port
