= Hosaka Tunnel =

Railway tunnel in Honshu, Japan

Hosaka Railway Tunnel
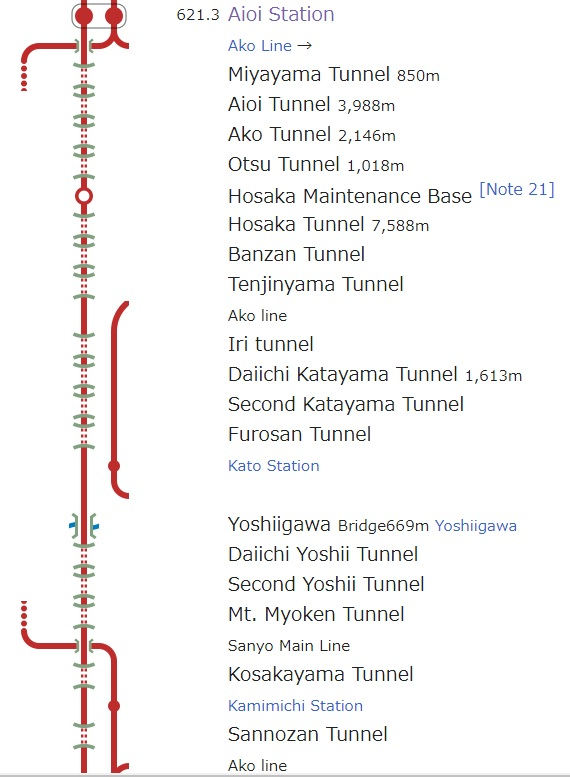
- Hosaka Tunnel on Sanyo Shinkansen line
- Interactive map of Hosaka Railway Tunnel

Overview
- Line: Sanyo Shinkansen
- Location: Aioi–Okayama
- Coordinates: 34°46′22.5″N 134°17′26.6″E

Operation
- Opened: 1975
- Operator: West Japan Railway Company
- Character: Passenger and freight

Technical
- Line length: 7,588 m (24,895 ft)

Hosaka Tunnel (帆坂トンネル, Hosaka tonneru) is a railway tunnel on West JR's Sanyo Shinkansen line located between Aioi Station, Hyogo Prefecture and Okayama Station, Kita-ku, Okayama city in Okayama Prefecture with total length of 7.588 km. It was built and completed in 1975.

== See also ==
- List of tunnels in Japan
- Seikan Tunnel undersea tunnel between Honshu-Hokkaido islands
- Kanmon Railway Tunnel undersea tunnel between Honshu-Kyushu islands
- Sakhalin–Hokkaido Tunnel proposed undersea tunnel between Rusia and Japan
- Bohai Strait tunnel proposed undersea tunnel in Yellow Sea, China
