= Aioi Tunnel =

Railway tunnel in Honshu, Japan

Aioi Railway Tunnel
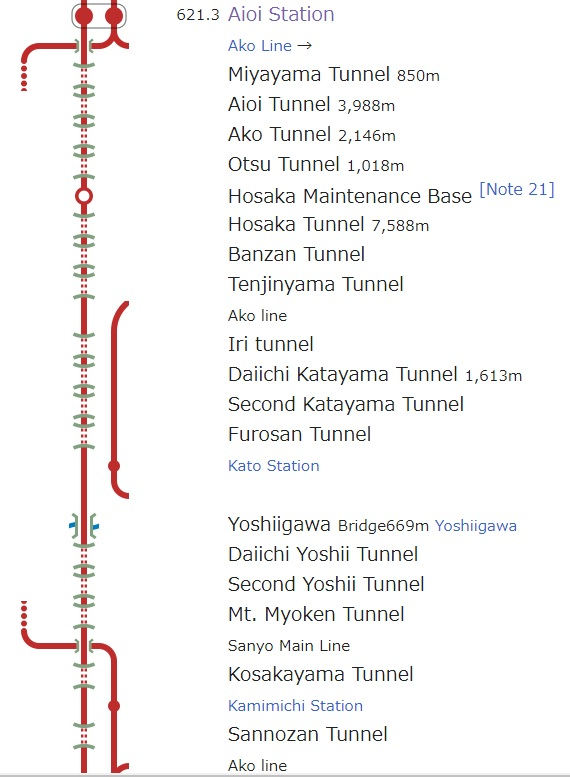
- Aioi Tunnel on Sanyo Shinkansen line
- Interactive map of Aioi Railway Tunnel

Overview
- Line: Sanyo Shinkansen line
- Location: Aioi–Okayama
- Coordinates: 34°48′51″N 134°26′14″E

Operation
- Opened: 1975
- Operator: West Japan Railway Company
- Character: Passenger and freight

Technical
- Line length: 3,988 m (13,084 ft)

Aioi Tunnel (相生トンネル, Aioi tonneru) is a railway tunnel on West Japan Railway Company's Sanyo Shinkansen line located between Aioi Station, Hyogo Prefecture and Okayama Station, Kita-ku, Okayama city in Okayama Prefecture with total length of 3,988 m (13,084 ft). It was built and completed in 1975. In December 2010, NTT Docomo mobile phone service area covers 14 tunnels on the Sanyo Shinkansen between Himeji and the Okayama prefecture border, including Aioi tunnel.

== See also ==
- List of tunnels in Japan
- Seikan Tunnel undersea tunnel between Honshu-Hokkaido islands
- Kanmon Railway Tunnel undersea tunnel between Honshu-Kyushu islands
- Sakhalin–Hokkaido Tunnel proposed undersea tunnel between Rusia and Japan
- Bohai Strait tunnel proposed undersea tunnel in Yellow Sea, China
