= Lüshun railway station =

Railway station in Dalian

Coordinates: 38.8068°N 121.2473°E

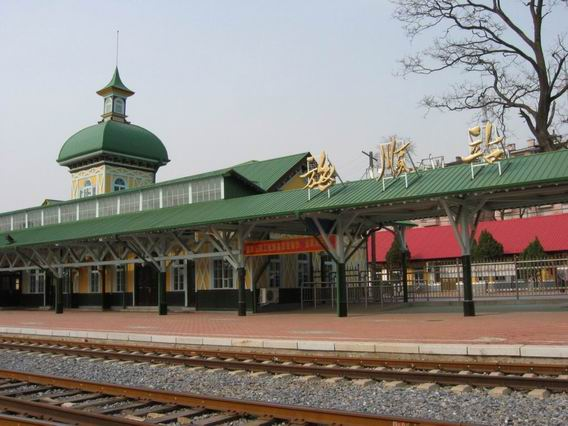
Lushun railway station

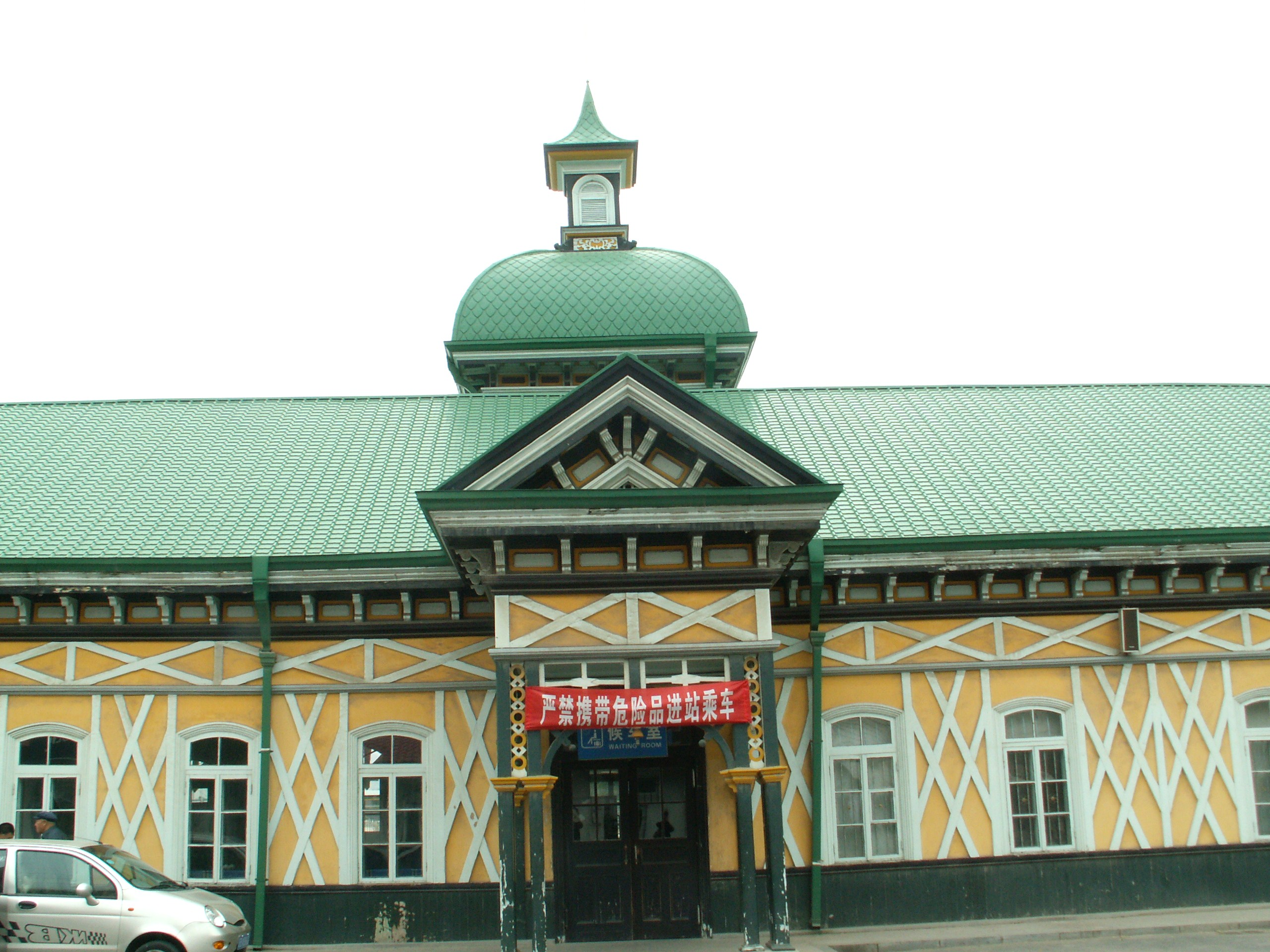
The Entrance to Lushun railway station

Lüshun railway station (in Chinese: 旅顺火车站) is located in Lüshunkou District of Dalian City, China, and is the final stop of the Dalian-Lushun branch of the Dalian-Harbin railway. It sits on the east side of the Long River, within a hundred meters of the Lüshun Naval Port, its building being of the Russian-style wooden architecture.

Currently, it is served by two passenger train services a day from Dalian.

In 2006, Lushun West railway station opened on another branch of the Dalian-Lushun railway branch, for Bohai Train Ferry.

Lushun has two train stations, but the photo of the train station does not match the actual photo.

This train station was rebuilt by the Japanese in 1905, but it retains Russian-style architecture.

== History ==
- 1898, Russia obtained the Kwantung Leased Territory and started construction of Chinese Eastern Railway
- 1900, construction of Lushun railway station was started
- 1903, Lushun railway station was completed and put into operation
- 1904, operation was halted due to the Russo-Japanese War
- 1905, after the fall of the Russian Lushun to the Japanese, the Russian broad gauge of the Dalian-Lushun branch line was changed to the Japanese narrow gauge
- 1906, was placed under the control of South Manchuria Railway
- 1907, the railway was changed to the standard gauge
- 1945, after the fall of the Japanese Lushun, operated jointly by China and the Soviet Union
- 1952, returned to China
- 1985, became a Cultural Heritage site of Dalian City
- 2005, rebuilt, retaining the original design

== See also ==
- Dalian & Lüshunkou District
- South Manchuria Railway
- Russo-Japanese War
- Rail gauge
- Bohai Train Ferry#Lushun West Station
- Dalian railway station
