= Bohai Strait tunnel project =

Proposed Eastern China underpass

Coordinates: 38.3°N 120.9°E

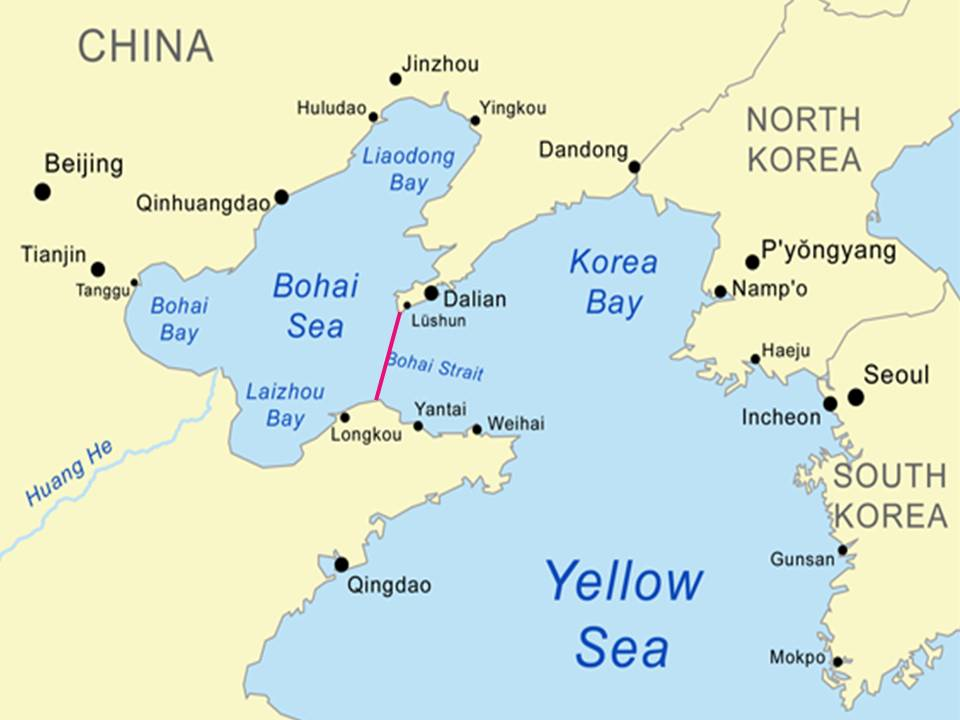
Bohai Strait Tunnel project (red line)

The Bohai Strait Tunnel or Dalian-Yantai Tunnel is a proposed undersea tunnel construction project across the Bohai Strait to connect Dalian on the Liaodong Peninsula with Yantai on the Shandong Peninsula. The official name for the project is Bohai Strait Cross-Sea Corridor (Chinese: 渤海海峡跨海通道).

Crossing the Bohai Strait, the tunnel would be 123 kilometers (76 mi) long, of which 90 kilometers (56 mi) would be underwater. This would exceed the combined lengths of the two longest undersea tunnels in the world, the Seikan Tunnel (23.3 km or 14.5 mi) and the Channel Tunnel (37.9 km or 23.5 mi).

Operated by China Railway Engineering Corporation, the tunnel would be linked to the Chinese high-speed railway system. Cars would be loaded on railway carriages to make the 40-minute crossing. Currently, the Bohai Train Ferry, inaugurated in 2007, crosses the strait in eight hours.

The project was estimated to cost 200 billion yuan (US$32 billion). In August 2014, it was reported that work is likely to commence during the 13th Five-year plan and construction would take ten years to complete.

As of March 2018, the central government wants to get construction underway on this bay connection 'as soon as possible'.

Plans were formally submitted to the National Development and Reform Commission (NRDC) for approval in May 2019. The project would include bridges from Penglai linking the Changshan Islands, then a tunnel under the main Bohai Strait, for a total length of 125 km. If construction was started in 2020, the opening date would be in the early 2030s. The estimated budget has risen to 300 billion yuan (US$43 billion).

== See also ==
- Fehmarn Belt fixed link – Under-construction immersed tunnel connecting Denmark and Germany
- Hong Kong–Zhuhai–Macau Bridge – Fixed link consisting of tunnel and multiple bridges
- Japan–Korea Undersea Tunnel – Proposed tunnel connecting Japan and Korea
- Kinmen–Xiamen Bridge – China-Taiwan bridge
- Qiongzhou Strait tunnel – Strait separating mainland China from Hainan
- Seikan Tunnel – Undersea railway tunnel in Japan
- Taiwan Strait Tunnel Project – Proposed road and rail tunnel
