= Kinmen–Xiamen Bridge =

China-Taiwan bridge

Kinmen-Xiamen Bridge
- Locale: Kinmen, Republic of China (Taiwan) / Xiamen, China

The Kinmen–Xiamen Bridge is an under construction cross-sea fixed link that would connect Kinmen (administered by the Republic of China (Taiwan)) to the mainland Chinese city of Xiamen. It will be designated as G1534 on the National Trunk Highway System. It is constructed in two sections, the Xiamen section connecting between Xiamen Island and the Xiamen Xiang'an International Airport, and the Kinmen–Xiamen section that will be a bridge. If completed, it would create the first direct land connection between territory administered by Taiwan and mainland China.

Chinese state media has reported that construction of the Xiamen-side section began in October 2023.

== Controversy ==
The proposal has been politically controversial in Taiwan due to cross-strait relations and national security concerns. In 2024, Kinmen County Councilor Chen Yang-hu (陳泱瑚) urged Taiwan's central government to support development of the project, citing reported construction progress on the Xiamen side.

Supporters have argued that the bridge could provide economic benefits for Kinmen, including tourism and commercial activity, with Kinmen County Councilor Chen Tsang-chiang describing it as an economic lifeline. Ko Wen-je, founder of the Taiwan People's Party, also supported the bridge, arguing it could be used to improve cross-strait relations.

Opponents, including figures associated with the Democratic Progressive Party and Taiwan's Mainland Affairs Council, have raised national security concerns, warning that the project could increase political and security risks for Taiwan. The bridge was described as “a road that lures wolves into the house” by Hsu Chih-chieh, a member of the Democratic Progressive Party. Taiwan's central government stated in 2025 that it had no plans to build a bridge, following a visit by a Kinmen delegation to a construction site in China that was described by local media as related to the proposed link. Taiwan's Mainland Affairs Council stated in 2026 that "the government has no policy or plans to pursue such projects."
