= Bohai Train Ferry =

Ferry service in China since 2007

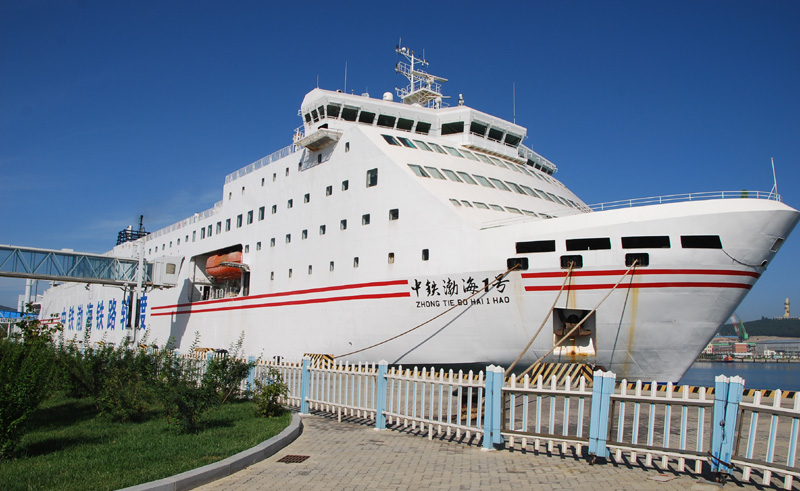
The Sinorail Bohai No. 1 Vessel (182.6 meters long)

Bohai Train Ferry (Chinese: 渤海铁路轮渡) is a train ferry service connecting Dalian, Liaoning and Yantai, Shandong in China over the Bohai Sea, which is the northern part of the Yellow Sea. The vessels used are 182.6 metres (599 ft) long and have been in operation since 2007.

== General ==
Some ideas of crossing the Yellow Sea from the Shandong Peninsula to the Liaodong Peninsula by means of other than the ships, such as the bridges or undersea tunnels, have been discussed in the history of China, particularly since the late 19th century when many people moved to Northeast China in the Chuang Guandong population move and the Beiyang Fleet was stationed in Weihaiwei, Shandong, and Lushun, Liaoning. However, as a more practical plan, Bohai Train Ferry was approved at the national level in December 2003; its construction being started in full swing in October 2004, its test operation in November 2006, and its full operation in 2007. It is the second oceanic train ferry in China after the Guangdong–Hainan Ferry (part of the Guangdong–Hainan Railway) and is the longest train ferry in the country.

The Bohai Train Ferry travels 99.8 nautical miles (184.8 km; 114.8 mi). Currently, there are six daily services (Dalian-Yantai: 09:30-16:00, 16:30-23:00 and 23:20-06:20; Yantai-Dalian: 05:20-11:50, 14:10-20:40 and 22:00-04:30; as of August 2009) by three vessels: the Sinorail Bohai No. 1, No. 2 and No. 3, each accommodating up to 50 railway freight cars, 50 twenty-ton trucks, 25 passenger cars and 400 passengers.

A new branch line of the Dalian-Lushun railway and a new highway branch were built to connect to this railway ferry. The ferry is in the northernmost part of the newly developed area on Yangtou Bay (Chinese: 羊头湾) of the Bohai Sea that includes World Peace Park, the new development zone and the universities (the Software and Information Engineering Departments of Dalian Jiaotong University and Dalian University of Foreign Economy and Trade (Chinese: 大连对外经贸学院)). Plans for a tunnel across the Bohai strait have been developed.

== Lüshun West railway station ==
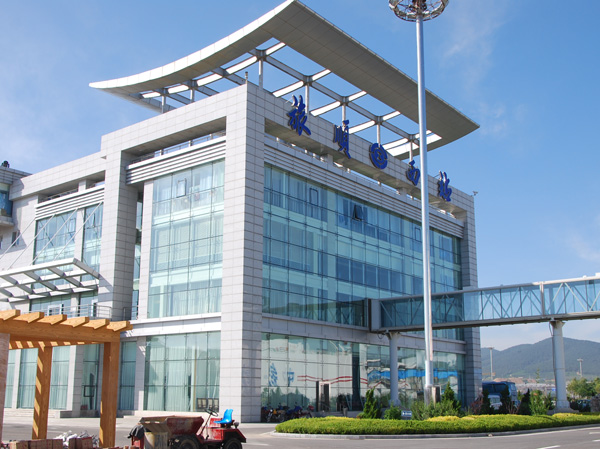
Building of Lüshun West railway station. The passengers get on the vessel from the concourse on the second floor.

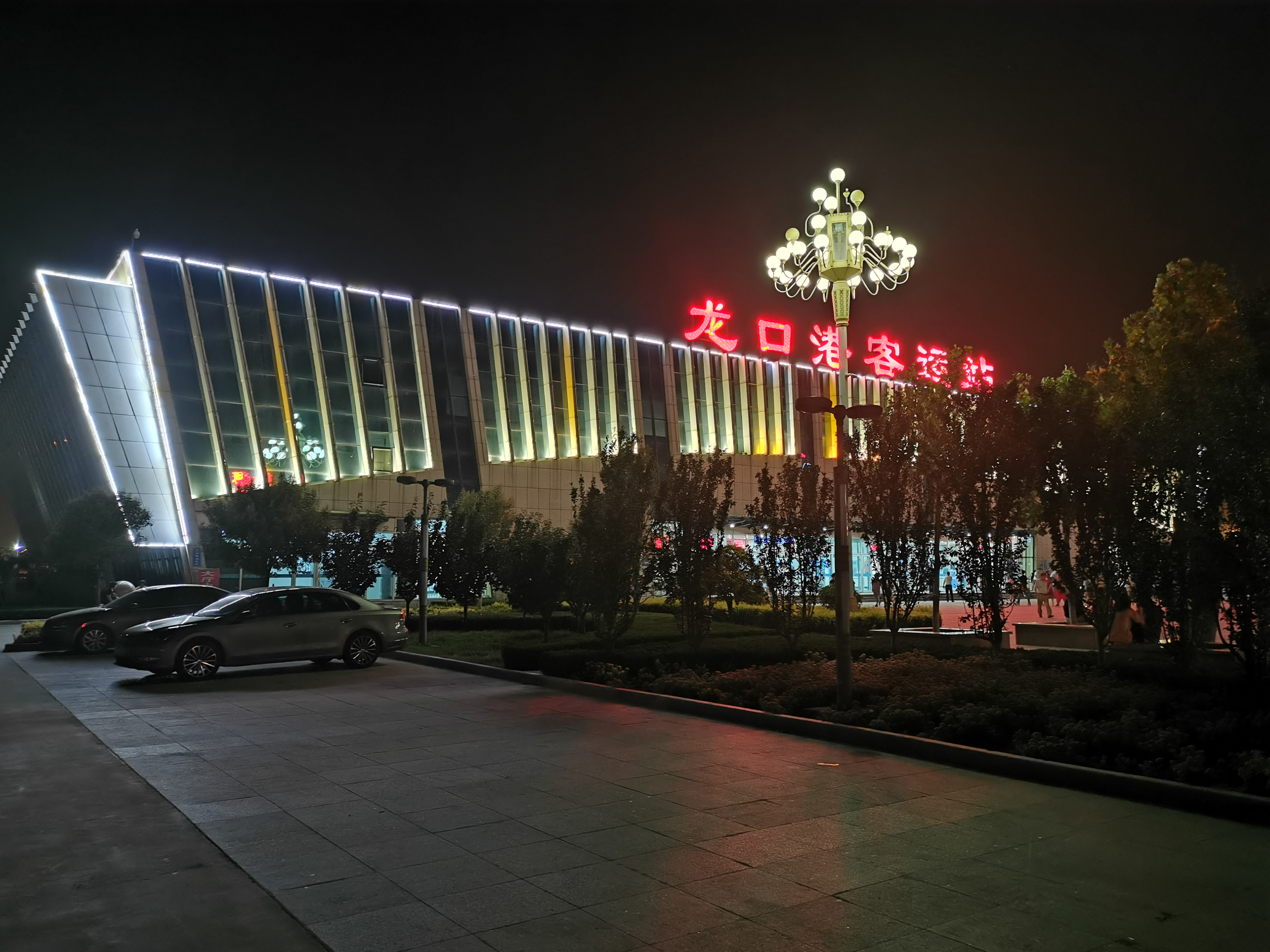
Longkou Ferry Station

The railway terminal on the Dalian side of Bohai Train Ferry is named as Lüshun West railway station. There are no platforms because no passenger trains pass through. There is a four-storey station building where the passengers can buy tickets on the first floor and go up to the second floor to enter the vessel through a concourse.

== Competition ==
- Dalian Port Ferries: Dalian-Yantai and Dalian-Weihai
- Railway: Dalian-Jinzhou-Tangshan-Jinan
- Airline: Dalian-Yantai

Compared to the Dalian Port Ferries near downtown Dalian, this ferry is located about 35 kilometres (22 mi) west of the downtown area, so that the ferry tariffs are set lower: 500 yuan for passenger car and 980 to 180 yuan for passengers (980 for special class, 680 for first class, 380 for second class, 260 for second class B, 240 for third class A, 200 for third class and 180 for third class B, as of August 2009).

== See also ==
- Dalian
- Lüshunkou District
- Yantai
- Bohai Strait Tunnel, a proposed project
