= Izumisawa Station =

Railway station in Kikonai, Hokkaido, Japan

Izumisawa Station 泉沢駅
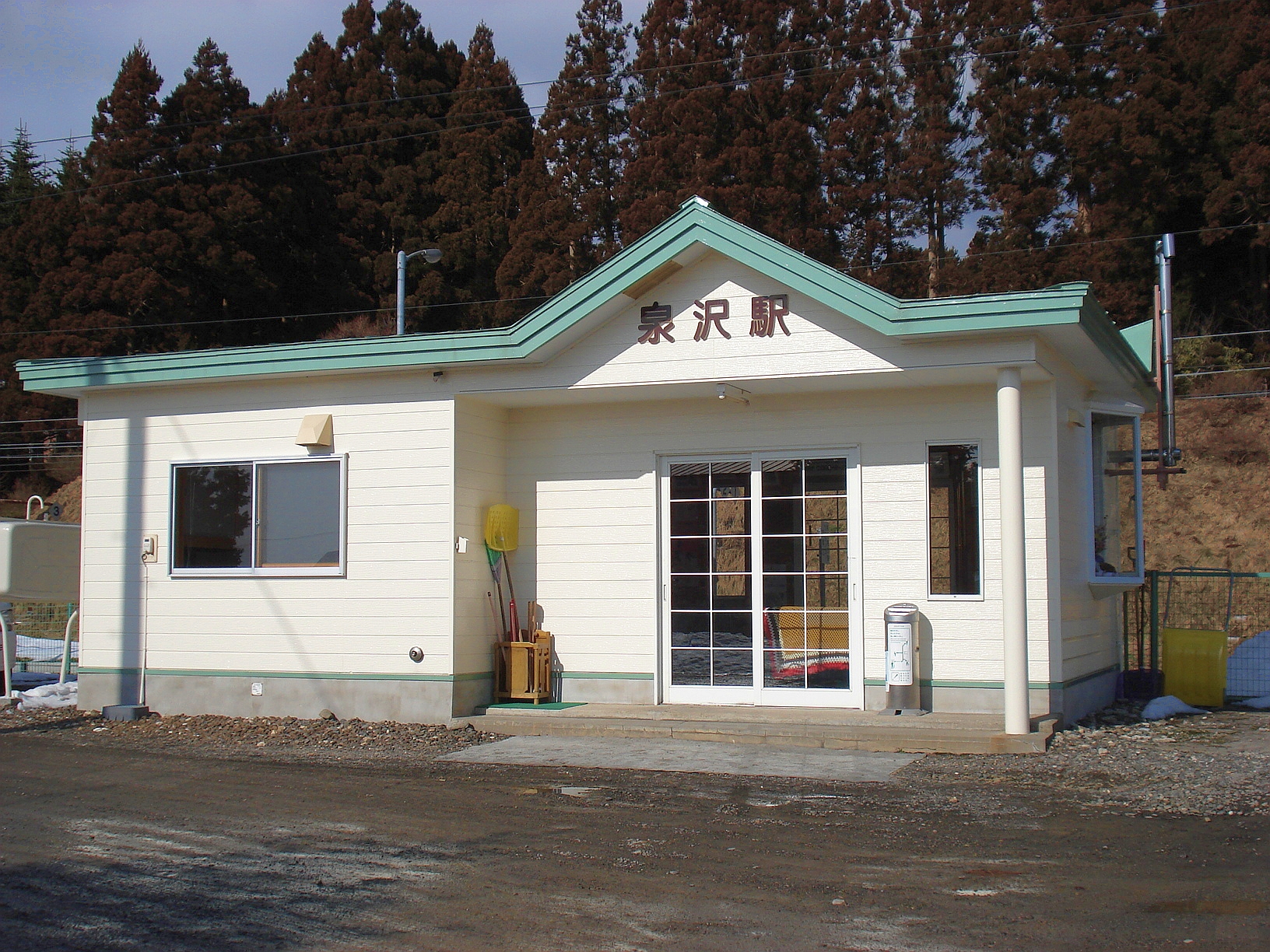
- Izumisawa Station, February 2009

General information
- Location: Kikonai, Kamiiso District, Hokkaido; Japan
- Coordinates: 41°42′03″N 140°30′24″E
- Operator: South Hokkaido Railway Company
- Line: South Hokkaido Railway Line
- Distance: 30.6 km (19.0 mi) from Goryōkaku
- Platforms: 1 island platform, 1 side platform
- Tracks: 3

Other information
- Station code: sh03

History
- Opened: 25 October 1930; 95 years ago

Services
Preceding station	South Hokkaido Railway Company	Following station
Satsukari towards Kikonai	South Hokkaido Railway Line	Kamaya towards Hakodate
Location
- Location within Hokkaido Location within Japan

Izumisawa Station (Japanese: 泉沢駅, Hepburn: Izumisawa-eki) is a railway station on the South Hokkaido Railway Line in Kikonai, Hokkaido, Japan, operated by South Hokkaido Railway Company.

== Lines ==
Izumisawa Station is served by the 37.8 km South Hokkaido Railway Line between Goryōkaku and Kikonai.

== History ==
Izumisawa Station on the Esashi Line opened on 25 October 1930. With the privatization of JNR on 1 April 1987, the station came under the control of JR Hokkaido.

Operations on the Esashi Line were transferred from JR Hokkaido to South Hokkaido Railway Company when the Hokkaido Shinkansen opened on 26 March 2016.

== See also ==
- List of railway stations in Japan
