= Kamaya Station =

Railway station in Kikonai, Hokkaido, Japan

Kamaya Station 釜谷駅
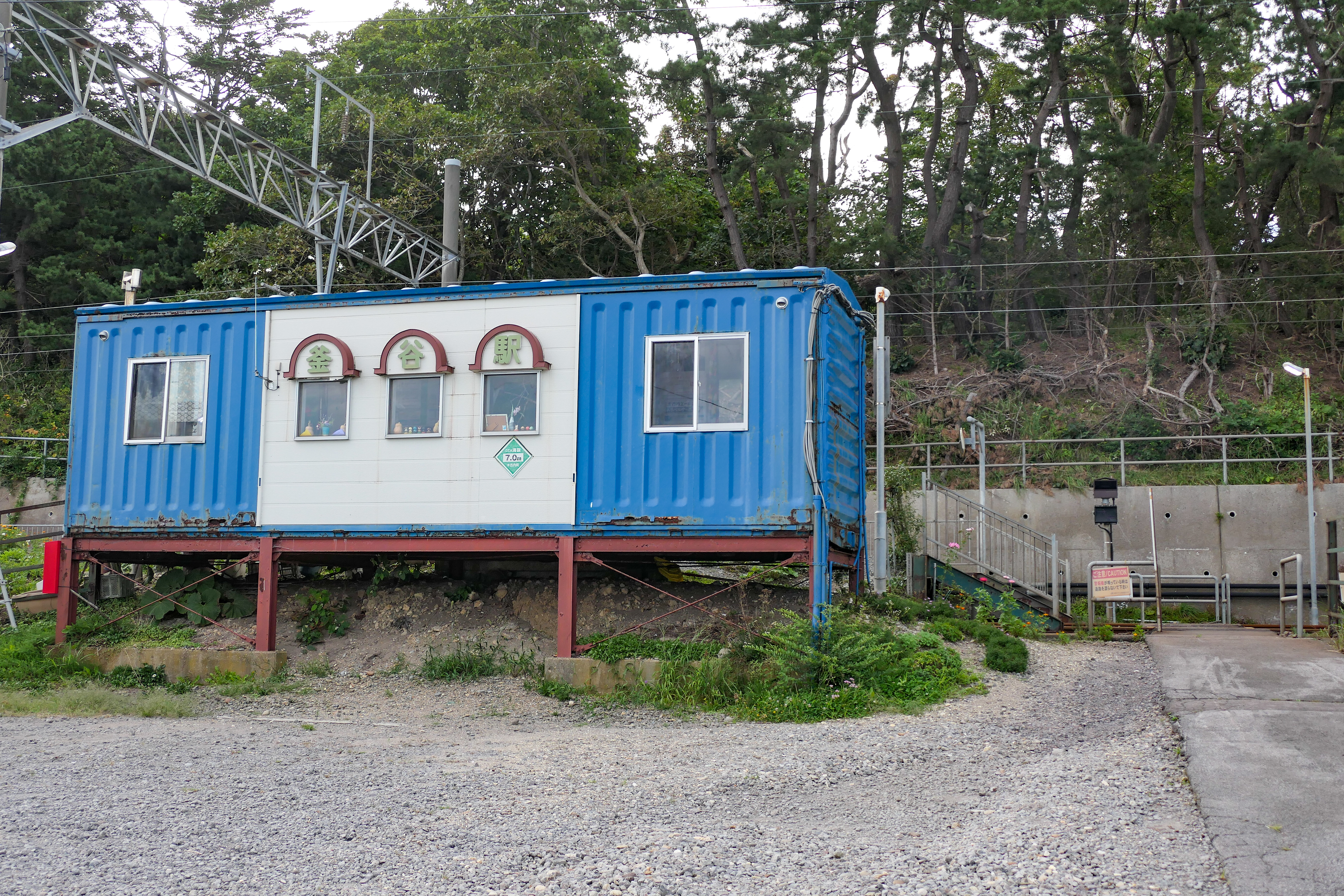
- Kamaya Station, September 2022

General information
- Location: Kikonai, Kamiiso District, Hokkaido; Japan
- Coordinates: 41°42′43″N 140°32′14″E
- Operator: South Hokkaido Railway Company
- Line: South Hokkaido Railway Line
- Distance: 27.5 km (17.1 mi) from Goryōkaku
- Platforms: 2 side platforms
- Tracks: 2

Other information
- Station code: sh04

History
- Opened: 25 October 1930; 95 years ago

Services
| Preceding station | South Hokkaido Railway Company | Following station |
|---|---|---|
| Izumisawa towards Kikonai | South Hokkaido Railway Line | Oshima-Tōbetsu towards Hakodate |
Location
- Location within Hokkaido Location within Japan

Kamaya Station (Japanese: 釜谷駅, Hepburn: Kamaya-eki) is a railway station on the South Hokkaido Railway Line in Kikonai, Hokkaido, Japan, operated by South Hokkaido Railway Company.

== Lines ==
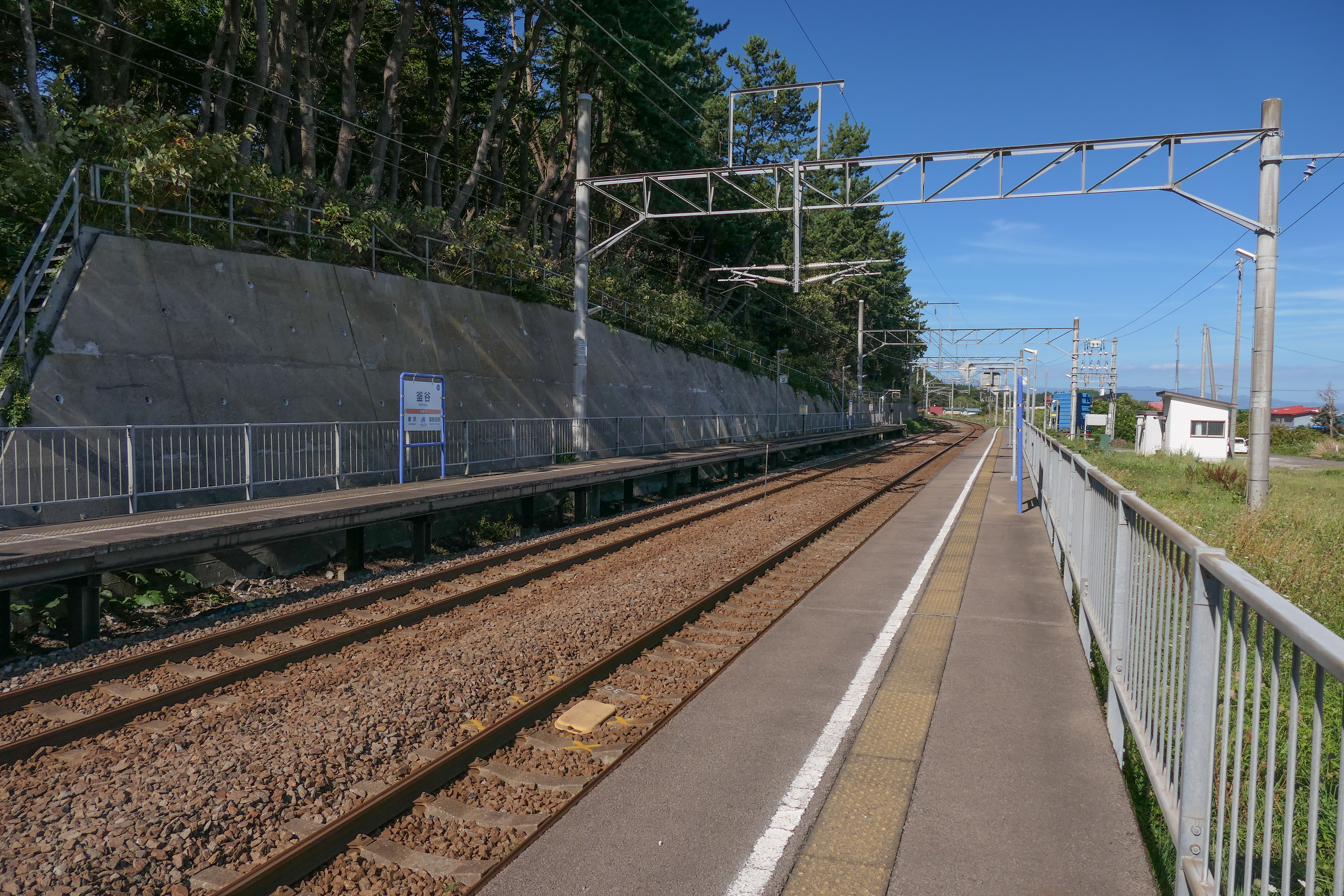
The platforms in September 2022

Kamaya Station is served by the 37.8 km South Hokkaido Railway Line between Goryōkaku and Kikonai.

== History ==
Kamaya Station on the Esashi Line opened on 25 October 1930. With the privatization of JNR on 1 April 1987, the station came under the control of JR Hokkaido.

Operations on the Esashi Line were transferred from JR Hokkaido to South Hokkaido Railway Company when the Hokkaido Shinkansen opened on 26 March 2016.

== See also ==
- List of railway stations in Japan
