= Esashi Line =

Railway line in Japan, 1913 to 2016

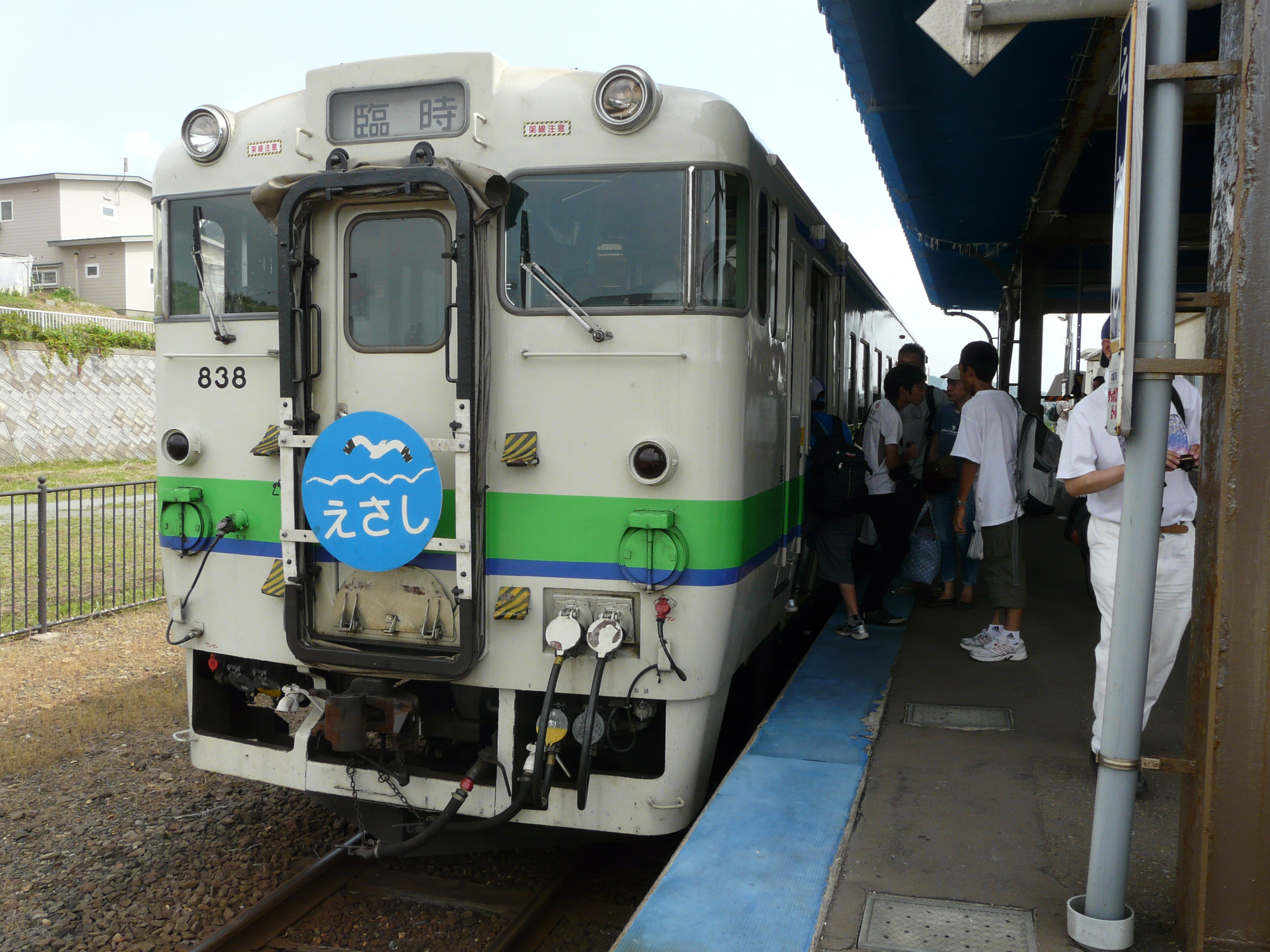

Overview
- Native name: 江差線
- Owner: JR Hokkaido
- Locale: Hokkaido
- Termini: Goryōkaku; Kikonai
- Stations: 12

Service
- Type: Regional rail

History
- Opened: 15 September 1913
- Closed: 26 March 2016 (Transferred to South Hokkaido Railway)

Technical
- Line length: 37.8 km (23.5 mi)
- Track gauge: 1,067 mm (3 ft 6 in)
- Electrification: 20 kV AC
Route map

The Esashi Line (江差線, Esashi-sen) was a Japanese railway line formerly operated by Hokkaido Railway Company (JR Hokkaido). It connected Goryōkaku (near Hakodate) and Esashi.

The section between Kikonai and Esashi closed in May 2014, and the remainder was transferred to third-sector railway operator South Hokkaido Railway Company in March 2016 following the opening of the Hokkaido Shinkansen.

== Stations ==
All stations are in Hokkaido.

Track: ∥: Double track, ∨: Double track ends, ◇: Passing loop |: No passing loop

=== Hakodate – Kikonai section (until March 2016) ===
Station	Japanese	Between (km)	Distance (km)	Transfers	Track	Location
Hakodate Main Line, part of Tsugaru-Kaikyō Line
Hakodate	函館	-	3.4	Hakodate City Tram	∥	Hakodate
Esashi Line, part of Tsugaru-Kaikyō Line
Goryōkaku	五稜郭	3.4	0.0	Hakodate Main Line	∨	Hakodate
Nanaehama	七重浜	2.7	2.7		◇	Hokuto
Higashi-Kunebetsu	東久根別	2.6	5.3		｜	Hokuto
Kunebetsu	久根別	1.2	6.5		◇	Hokuto
Kiyokawaguchi	清川口	1.1	7.6		｜	Hokuto
Kamiiso	上磯	1.2	8.8		◇	Hokuto
Moheji	茂辺地	8.8	17.6		◇	Hokuto
Oshima-Tōbetsu	渡島当別	5.0	22.6		◇	Hokuto
Kamaya	釜谷	4.9	27.5		◇	Kikonai
Izumisawa	泉沢	3.1	30.6		◇	Kikonai
Satsukari	札苅	3.4	34.0		◇	Kikonai
Kikonai	木古内	3.8	37.8	Kaikyō Line	◇	Kikonai

=== Former Kikonai – Esashi section (closed May 2014) ===
Station	Japanese	Between (km)	Distance (km)	Transfers	Track	Location
Oshima-Tsuruoka	渡島鶴岡	2.3	40.1		｜	Kikonai
Yoshibori	吉堀	3.1	43.2		｜	Kikonai
Shinmei	神明	13.2	56.4		｜	Kaminokuni
Yunotai	湯ノ岱	2.8	59.2		◇	Kaminokuni
Miyakoshi	宮越	7.1	66.3		｜	Kaminokuni
Katsuraoka	桂岡	2.2	68.5		｜	Kaminokuni
Naka-Suda	中須田	2.1	70.6		｜	Kaminokuni
Kaminokuni	上ノ国	3.2	73.8		｜	Kaminokuni
Esashi	江差	6.1	79.9		｜	Esashi

== History ==
The Goryokaku to Kamiiso section opened on 15 September 1913, and was extended to Kikonai on 25 October 1930. The Kikonai to Yunotai section opened on 10 December 1935, and was extended to Esashi on 10 November 1936.

The Goryokaku to Kikonai section was electrified on 13 March 1988 as part of the upgrading of the line associated with the opening of the Seikan Tunnel and associated Kaikyo Line linking Hokkaido to Honshu.

On 7 August 2012, JR Hokkaido announced its intention to close the 42 km (26 mi) non-electrified section of the line between Kikonai and Esashi in spring 2014 due to a lack of financial viability. In fiscal 2011, the Kikonai to Esashi section was served by six return services daily, with an average patronage of 41 passengers per km daily, the lowest for any of JR Hokkaido's lines. The Kikonai – Esashi section was closed in 2014, with the last services operating on 11 May.

Operations on the remaining section of the line between Goryōkaku and Kikonai was transferred from JR Hokkaido to the newly created South Hokkaido Railway Company when the Hokkaido Shinkansen opened on 26 March 2016.

=== Former connecting lines ===
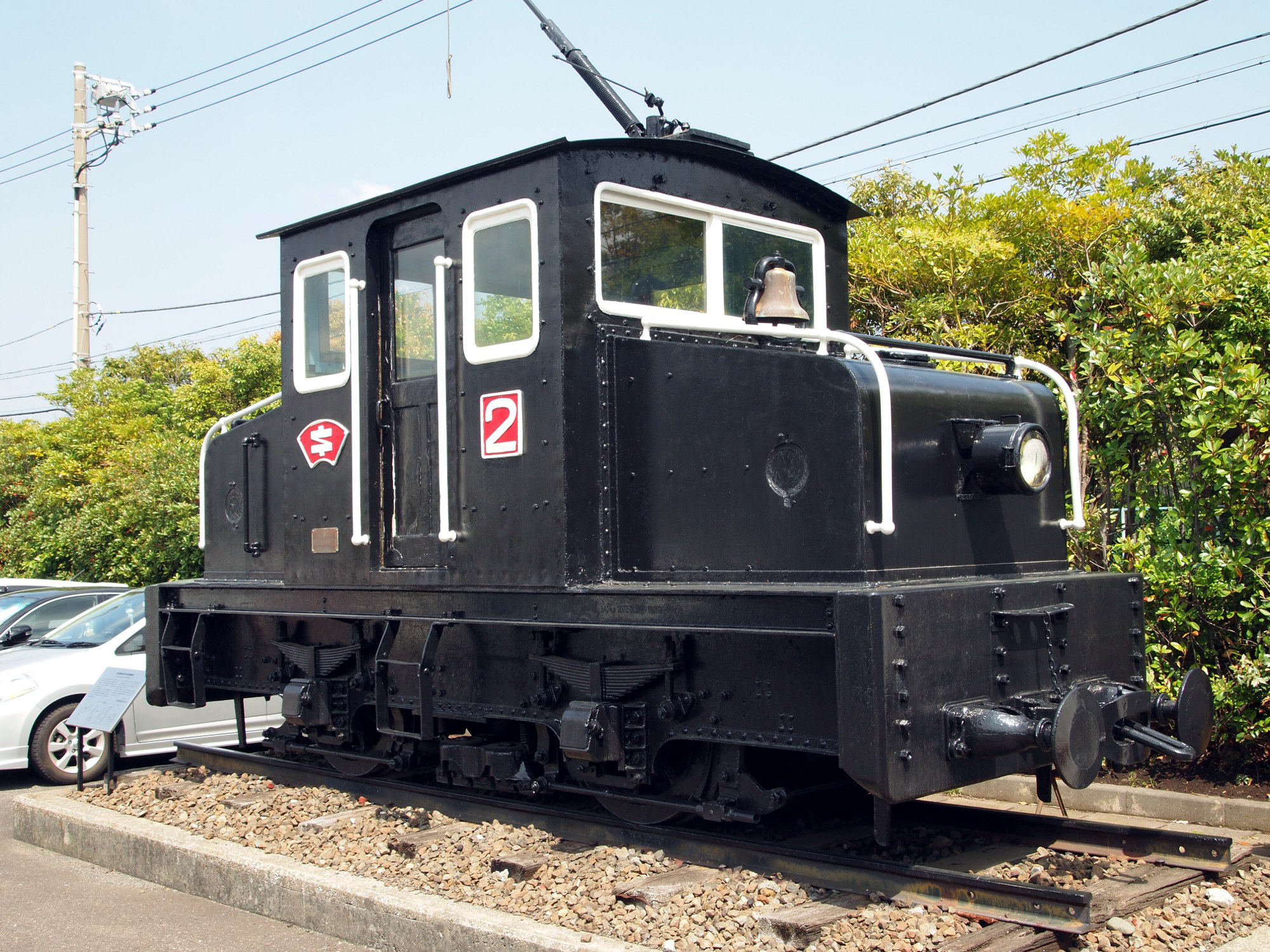
Japan Cement Co. loco No. 2 was in service at Kamiiso from 1922 until 1975

- Kamiiso station: A 500 m spur line served the Japan Cement Co factory from 1915 to 1989. A private 6.6 km (4.1 mi) line transported limestone to the factory from 1921 to 1956, being electrified at 600 V DC from 1922. A second 3.4 km (2.1 mi) line to a limestone quarry operated from 1949 until replaced by a conveyor belt in 1973.
- Kikonai station: In 1937, the 8 km (5.0 mi) section to Shiriuchi opened, the beginning of a 75 km (47 mi) line to serve a proposed manganese mine at Oshima. The line reached Matsumae (51 km or 32 mi) in 1953, and closed in 1988. The last 24 km (15 mi) to the manganese deposit was not constructed.
