= Kamiiso Station =

Railway station in Hokuto, Hokkaido, Japan

Kamiiso Station 上磯駅
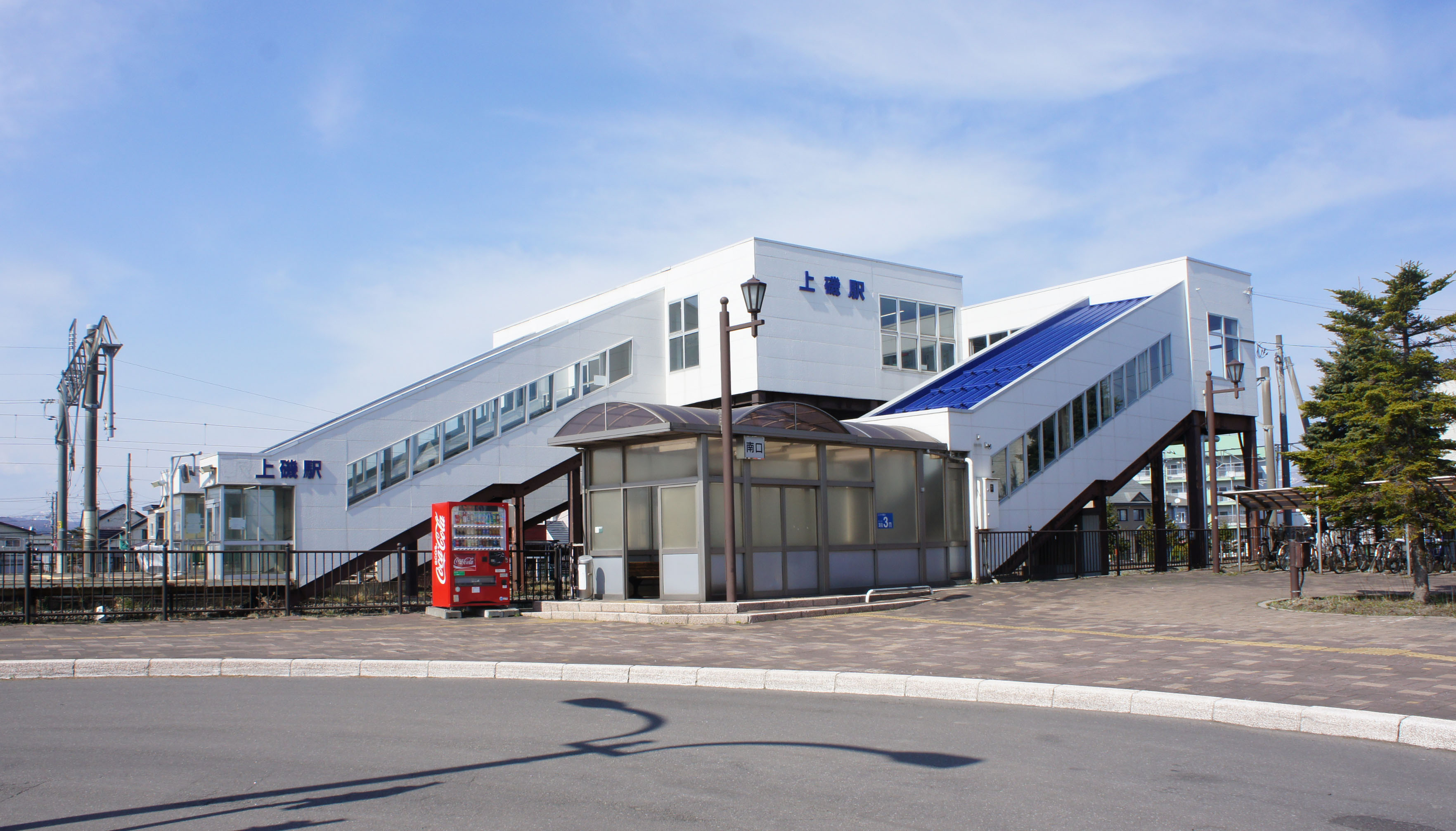
- Kamiiso Station in April 2019

General information
- Location: Hokuto, Hokkaido; Japan
- Coordinates: 41°49′11″N 140°38′26″E
- Operator: South Hokkaido Railway Company
- Line: South Hokkaido Railway Line
- Distance: 8.8 km (5.5 mi) from Goryōkaku
- Platforms: 1 island platform, 1 side platform
- Tracks: 3

Other information
- Station code: sh07

History
- Opened: 15 September 1913; 113 years ago

Services
Preceding station	South Hokkaido Railway Company	Following station
Moheji towards Kikonai	South Hokkaido Railway Line	Kiyokawaguchi towards Hakodate
Location
- Location within Hokkaido Location within Japan

Kamiiso Station (Japanese: 上磯駅, Hepburn: Kamiiso-eki) is a railway station on the South Hokkaido Railway Line in Hokuto, Hokkaido, Japan, operated by South Hokkaido Railway Company.

== Lines ==
Kamiiso Station is served by the 37.8 km South Hokkaido Railway Line between Goryōkaku and Kikonai.

== Station layout ==
The station has two platforms serving three tracks.

=== Platforms ===
1	■ South Hokkaido Railway	for Hakodate (Trains starting here)
2	■ South Hokkaido Railway	for Kikonai
3	■ South Hokkaido Railway	for Hakodate

== History ==
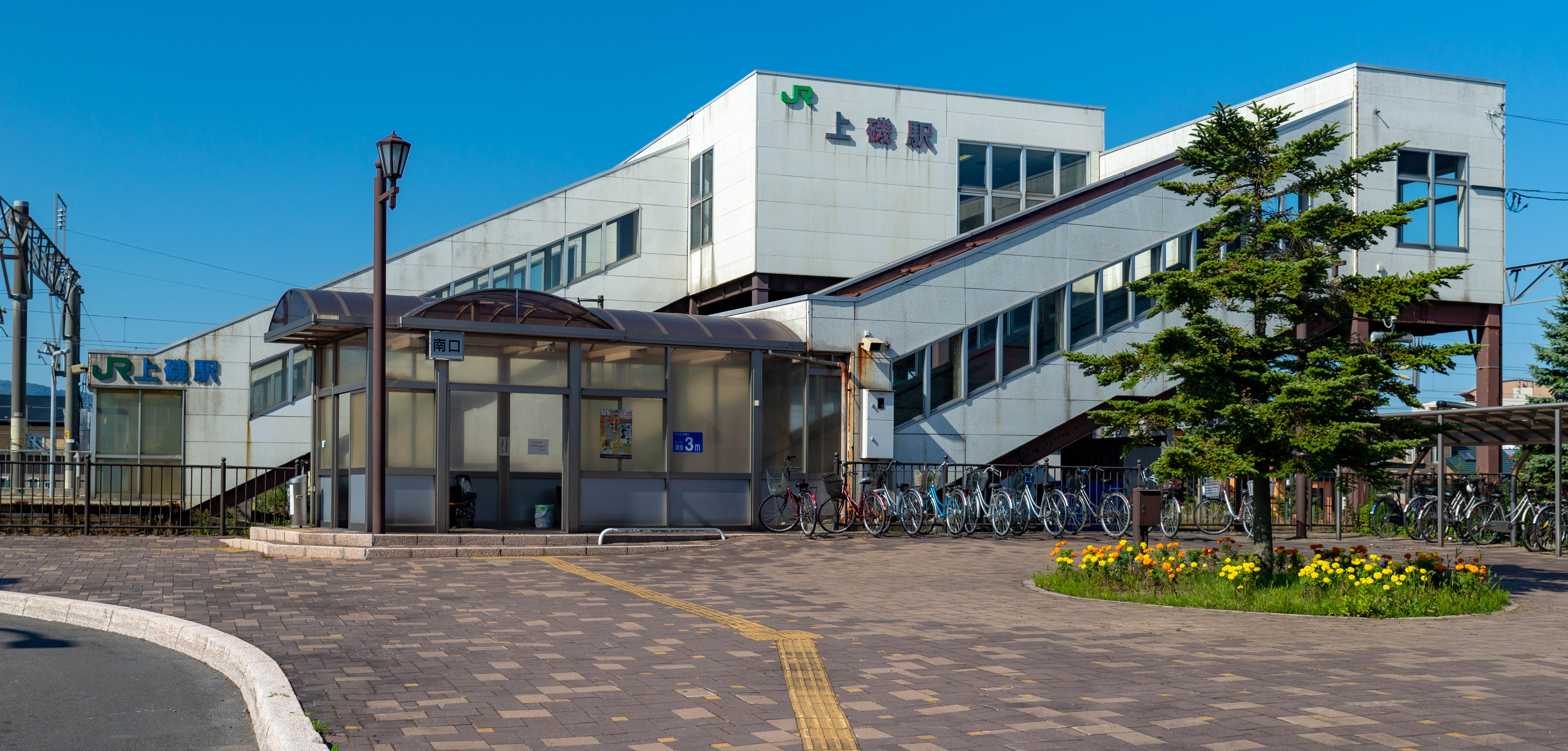
Kamiiso Station in September 2014 before it got transferred to South Hokkaido Railway Company

Kamiiso Station on the Esashi Line opened on 15 September 1913. With the privatization of JNR on 1 April 1987, the station came under the control of JR Hokkaido.

Operations on the Esashi Line were transferred from JR Hokkaido to South Hokkaido Railway Company when the Hokkaido Shinkansen opened on 26 March 2016.

== Surrounding area ==
- Hokuto Post Office

== See also ==
- List of railway stations in Japan
