= Oshima-Tsuruoka Station =

Former railway station in Kikonai, Hokkaido, Japan

Coordinates: 41.6713°N 140.4113°E

Oshima-Tsuruoka Station 渡島鶴岡駅
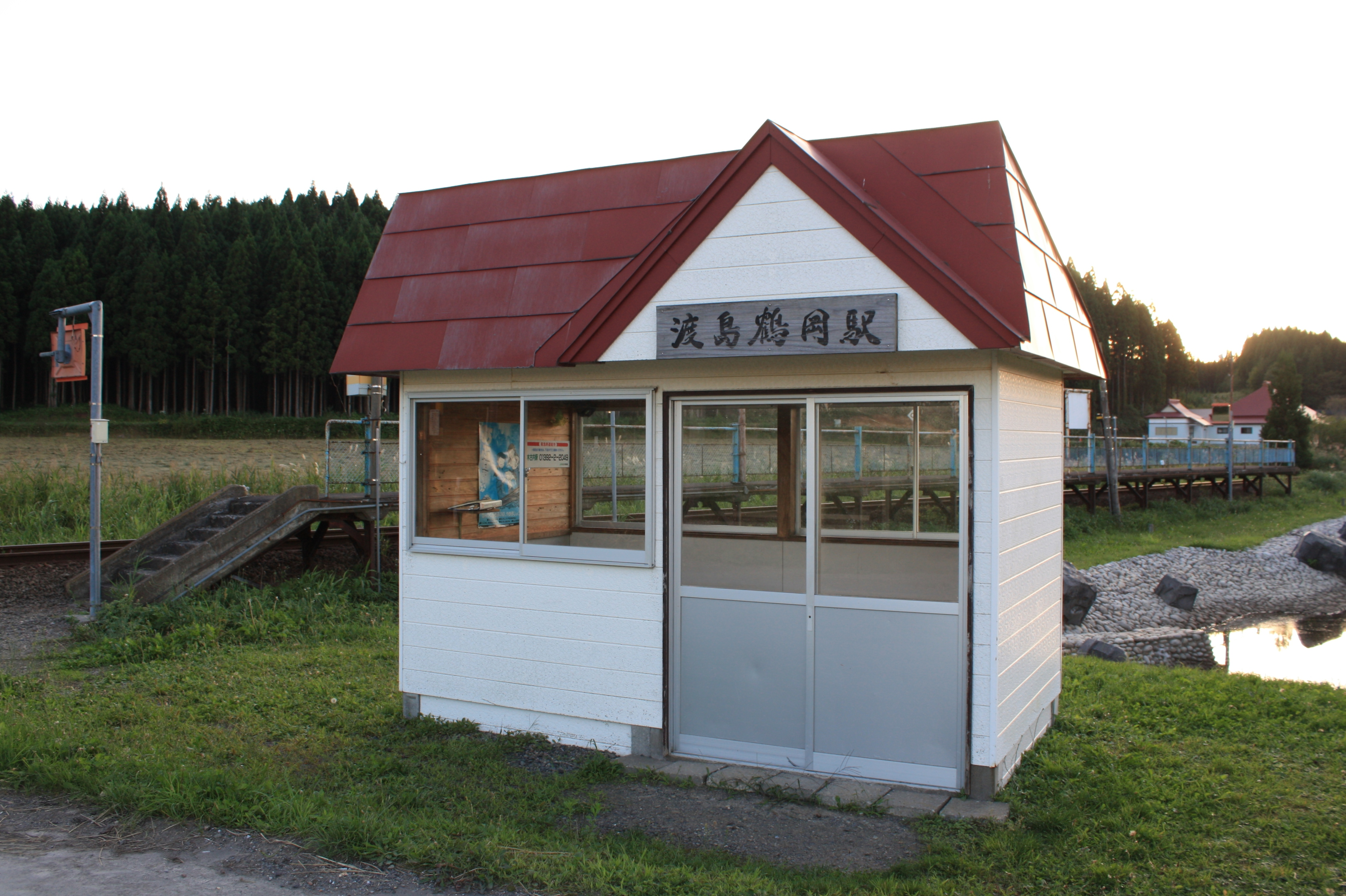
- Oshima-Tsuruoka Station in September 2008

General information
- Location: Tsuruoka, Kikonai, Kamiiso District, Hokkaido; Japan
- Operator: JR Hokkaido
- Line: Esashi Line

History
- Opened: 30 December 1964
- Closed: May 2014
Location
- Location within Hokkaido Location within Japan

Oshima-Tsuruoka Station (渡島鶴岡駅, Oshima-Tsuruoka-eki) was a railway station on the Esashi Line in Kikonai, Hokkaido, Japan, operated by Hokkaido Railway Company (JR Hokkaido). It opened in 1964 and closed in May 2014.

== Lines ==
Oshima-Tsuruoka Station was served by the non-electrified section of the Esashi Line between Kikonai and Esashi.

== Station layout ==
The station consisted of a single side platform serving a bidirectional single track.

== Adjacent stations ==
«	Service	»
Esashi Line
Kikonai	Local	Yoshibori

== History ==
Oshima-Tsuruoka Station opened on 30 December 1964. With the privatization of JNR on 1 April 1987, the station came under the control of JR Hokkaido. The station closed in 2014, with the last services on the line running on 11 May.

== See also ==
- List of railway stations in Japan
