= Kunebetsu Station =

Railway station in Hokuto, Hokkaido, Japan

Kunebetsu Station 久根別駅
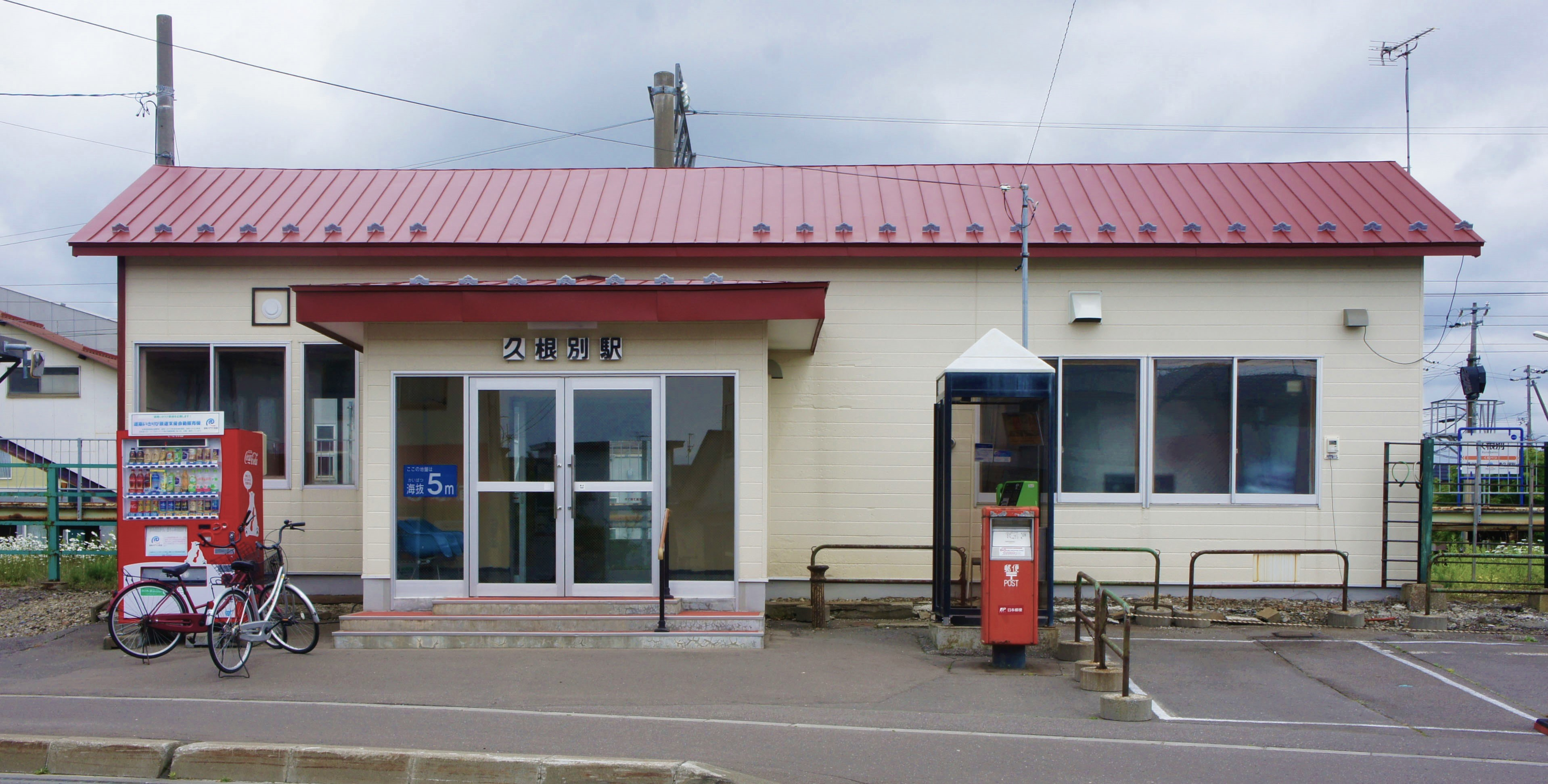

General information
- Location: Hokuto, Hokkaido; Japan
- Coordinates: 41°49′36″N 140°39′59″E
- Operator: South Hokkaido Railway Company
- Line: South Hokkaido Railway Line
- Distance: 6.5 km (4.0 mi) from Goryōkaku
- Platforms: 1 island platform, 1 side platform
- Tracks: 3

Other information
- Station code: sh09

History
- Opened: 15 September 1913; 113 years ago

Services
Preceding station	South Hokkaido Railway Company	Following station
Kiyokawaguchi towards Kikonai	South Hokkaido Railway Line	Higashi-Kunebetsu towards Hakodate
Location
- Location within Hokkaido Location within Japan

Kunebetsu Station (Japanese: 久根別駅, Hepburn: Kunebetsu-eki) is a railway station on the South Hokkaido Railway Line in Hokuto, Hokkaido, Japan, operated by South Hokkaido Railway Company.

== Lines ==
Kunebetsu Station is served by the 37.8 km South Hokkaido Railway Line between Goryōkaku and Kikonai.

== History ==
Kunebetsu Station on the Esashi Line opened on 15 September 1913. With the privatization of JNR on 1 April 1987, the station came under the control of JR Hokkaido.

Operations on the Esashi Line were transferred from JR Hokkaido to South Hokkaido Railway Company when the Hokkaido Shinkansen opened on 26 March 2016.

== See also ==
- List of railway stations in Japan
