= Oshima-Tōbetsu Station =

Railway station in Hokuto, Hokkaido, Japan

Oshima-Tōbetsu Station 渡島当別駅
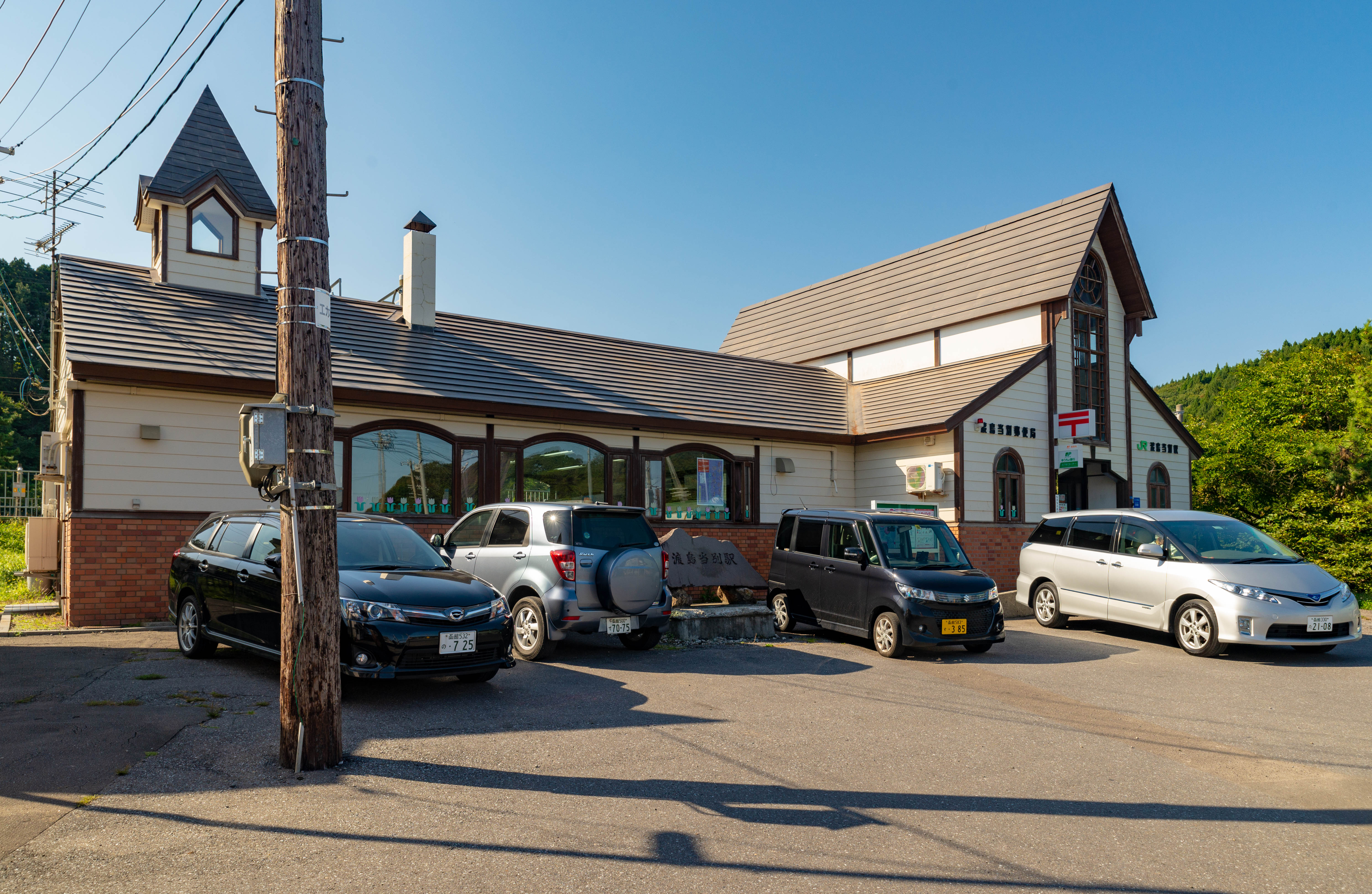
- Oshima-Tōbetsu Station in September 2014

General information
- Location: Hokuto, Hokkaido; Japan
- Coordinates: 41°44′15″N 140°34′45″E
- Operator: South Hokkaido Railway Company
- Line: South Hokkaido Railway Line
- Distance: 22.6 km (14.0 mi) from Goryōkaku
- Platforms: 2 side platforms
- Tracks: 2

Other information
- Station code: sh05

History
- Opened: 25 October 1930; 95 years ago

Services
| Preceding station | South Hokkaido Railway Company | Following station |
|---|---|---|
| Kamaya towards Kikonai | South Hokkaido Railway Line | Moheji towards Hakodate |
Location
- Location within Hokkaido Location within Japan

Oshima-Tōbetsu Station (Japanese: 渡島当別駅, Hepburn: Oshima-Tōbetsu-eki) is a railway station on the South Hokkaido Railway Line in Hokuto, Hokkaido, Japan, operated by South Hokkaido Railway Company.

== Lines ==
Oshima-Tōbetsu Station is served by the 37.8 km South Hokkaido Railway Line between Goryōkaku and Kikonai.

== History ==
Oshima-Tōbetsu Station on the Esashi Line opened on 25 October 1930. With the privatization of JNR on 1 April 1987, the station came under the control of JR Hokkaido.

Operations on the Esashi Line were transferred from JR Hokkaido to South Hokkaido Railway Company when the Hokkaido Shinkansen opened on 26 March 2016.

== See also ==
- List of railway stations in Japan
