= Kiyokawaguchi Station =

Railway station in Hokuto, Hokkaido, Japan

Kiyokawaguchi Station 清川口駅
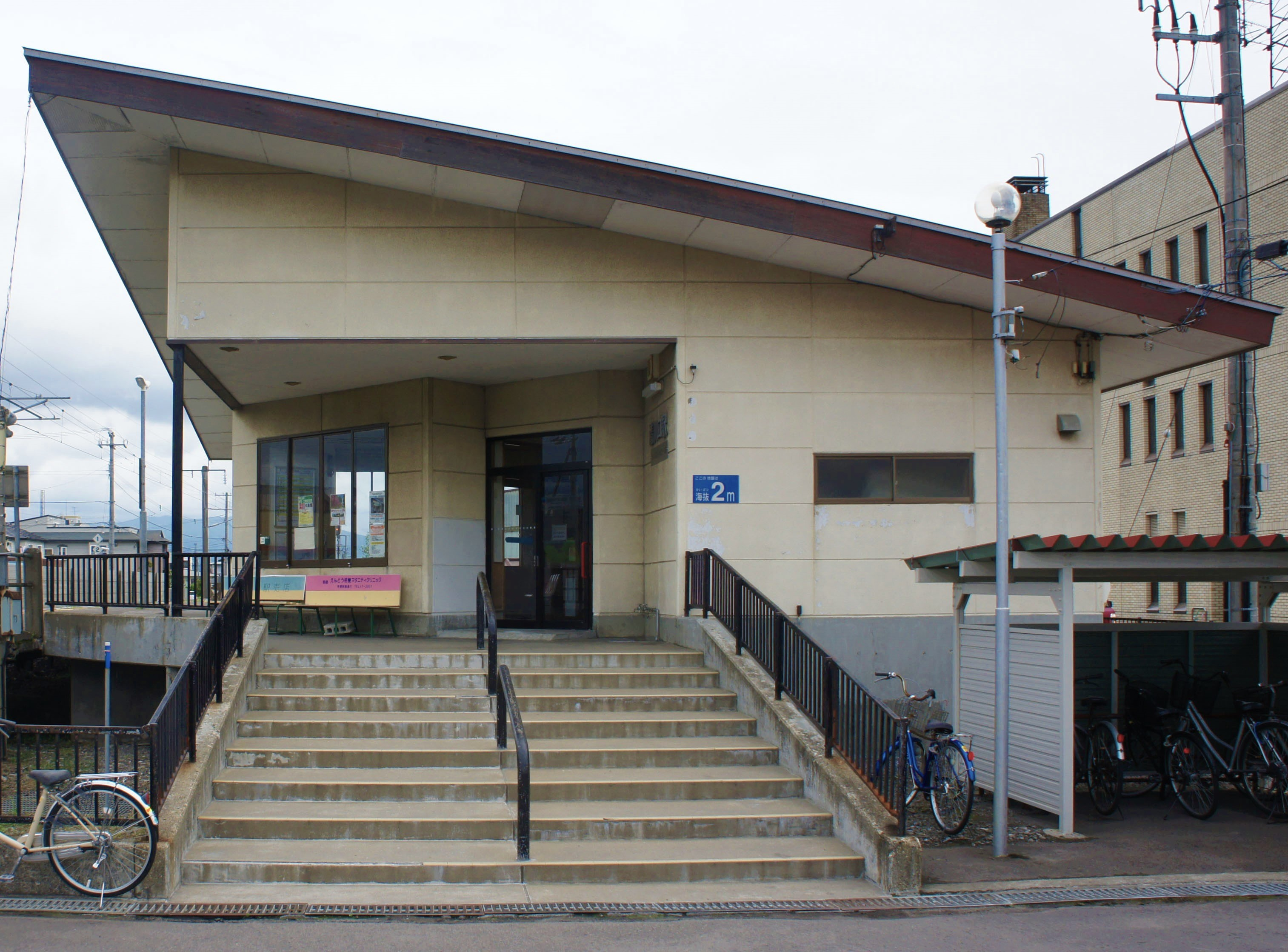

General information
- Location: Hokuto, Hokkaido; Japan
- Coordinates: 41°49′29″N 140°39′10″E
- Operator: South Hokkaido Railway Company
- Line: South Hokkaido Railway Line
- Distance: 7.6 km (4.7 mi) from Goryōkaku
- Platforms: 1 side platform
- Tracks: 1

Other information
- Station code: sh08

History
- Opened: 1 October 1956; 69 years ago

Services
Preceding station	South Hokkaido Railway Company	Following station
Kamiiso towards Kikonai	South Hokkaido Railway Line	Kunebetsu towards Hakodate
Location
- Location within Hokkaido Location within Japan

Kiyokawaguchi Station (Japanese: 清川口駅, Hepburn: Kiyokawaguchi-eki) is a railway station on the South Hokkaido Railway Line in Hokuto, Hokkaido, Japan, operated by South Hokkaido Railway Company.

== Lines ==
Kiyokawaguchi Station is served by the 37.8 km South Hokkaido Railway Line between Goryōkaku and Kikonai.

== History ==
Kiyokawaguchi Station on the Esashi Line opened on 1 October 1956. With the privatization of JNR on 1 April 1987, the station came under the control of JR Hokkaido.

Operations on the Esashi Line were transferred from JR Hokkaido to South Hokkaido Railway Company when the Hokkaido Shinkansen opened on 26 March 2016.

== See also ==
- List of railway stations in Japan
