= Moheji Station =

Railway station in Hokuto, Hokkaido, Japan

Moheji Station 茂辺地駅
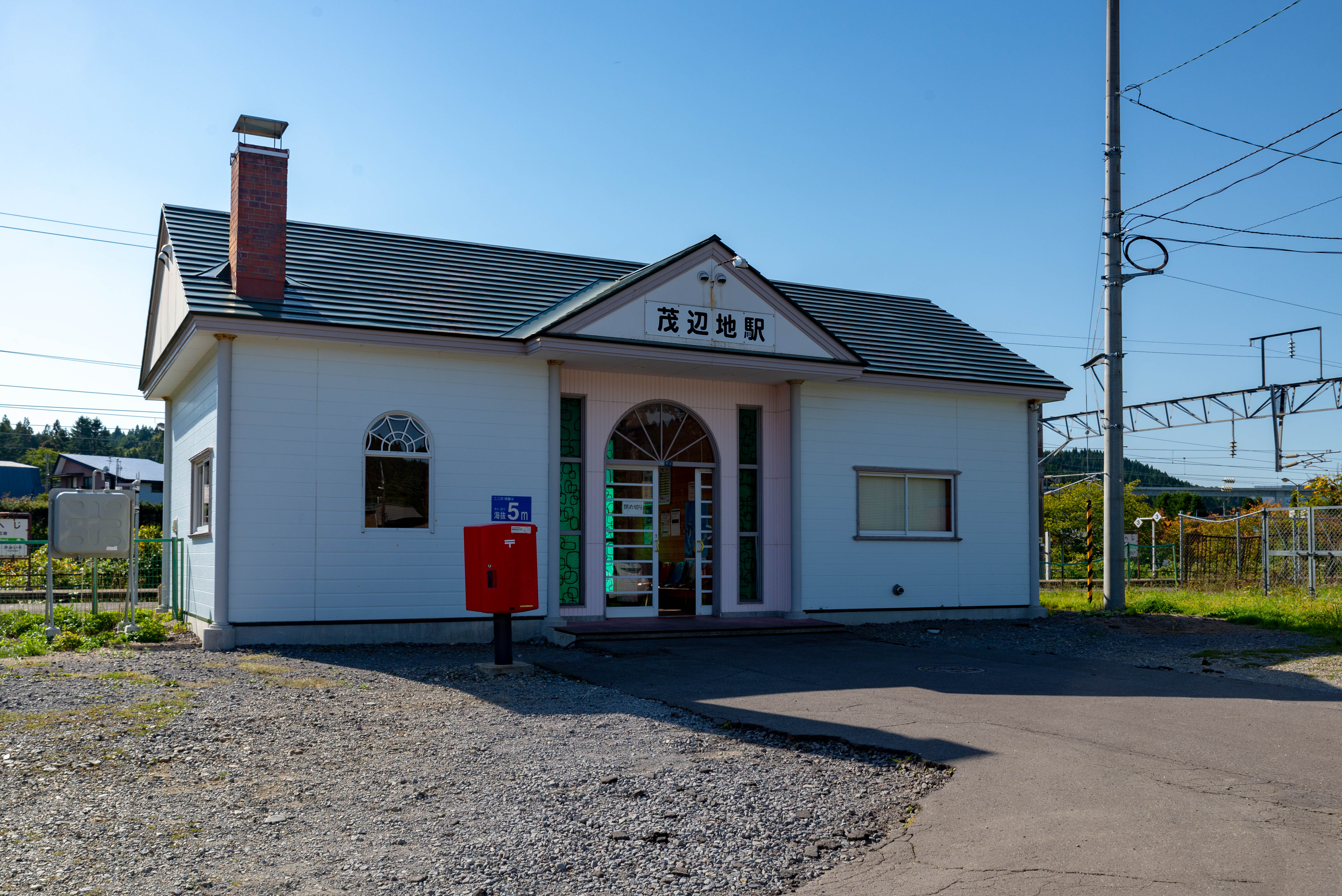
- Moheji Station, September 2014

General information
- Location: Hokuto, Hokkaido; Japan
- Coordinates: 41°45′59″N 140°36′05″E
- Operator: South Hokkaido Railway Company
- Line: South Hokkaido Railway Line
- Distance: 17.6 km (10.9 mi) from Goryōkaku
- Platforms: 1 island platform, 1 side platform
- Tracks: 3

Other information
- Station code: sh06

History
- Opened: 25 October 1930; 95 years ago

Services
Preceding station	South Hokkaido Railway Company	Following station
Oshima-Tōbetsu towards Kikonai	South Hokkaido Railway Line	Kamiiso towards Hakodate
Location
- Location within Hokkaido Location within Japan

Moheji Station (Japanese: 茂辺地駅, Hepburn: Moheji-eki) is a railway station on the South Hokkaido Railway Line in Hokuto, Hokkaido, Japan, operated by South Hokkaido Railway Company.

== Lines ==
Moheji Station is served by the 37.8 km South Hokkaido Railway Line between Goryōkaku and Kikonai.

== History ==
Moheji Station on the Esashi Line opened on 25 October 1930. With the privatization of JNR on 1 April 1987, the station came under the control of JR Hokkaido.

Operations on the Esashi Line were transferred from JR Hokkaido to South Hokkaido Railway Company when the Hokkaido Shinkansen opened on 26 March 2016.

== See also ==
- List of railway stations in Japan
