= Higashi-Kunebetsu Station =

Railway station in Hokuto, Hokkaido, Japan

Higashi-Kunebetsu Station 東久根別駅
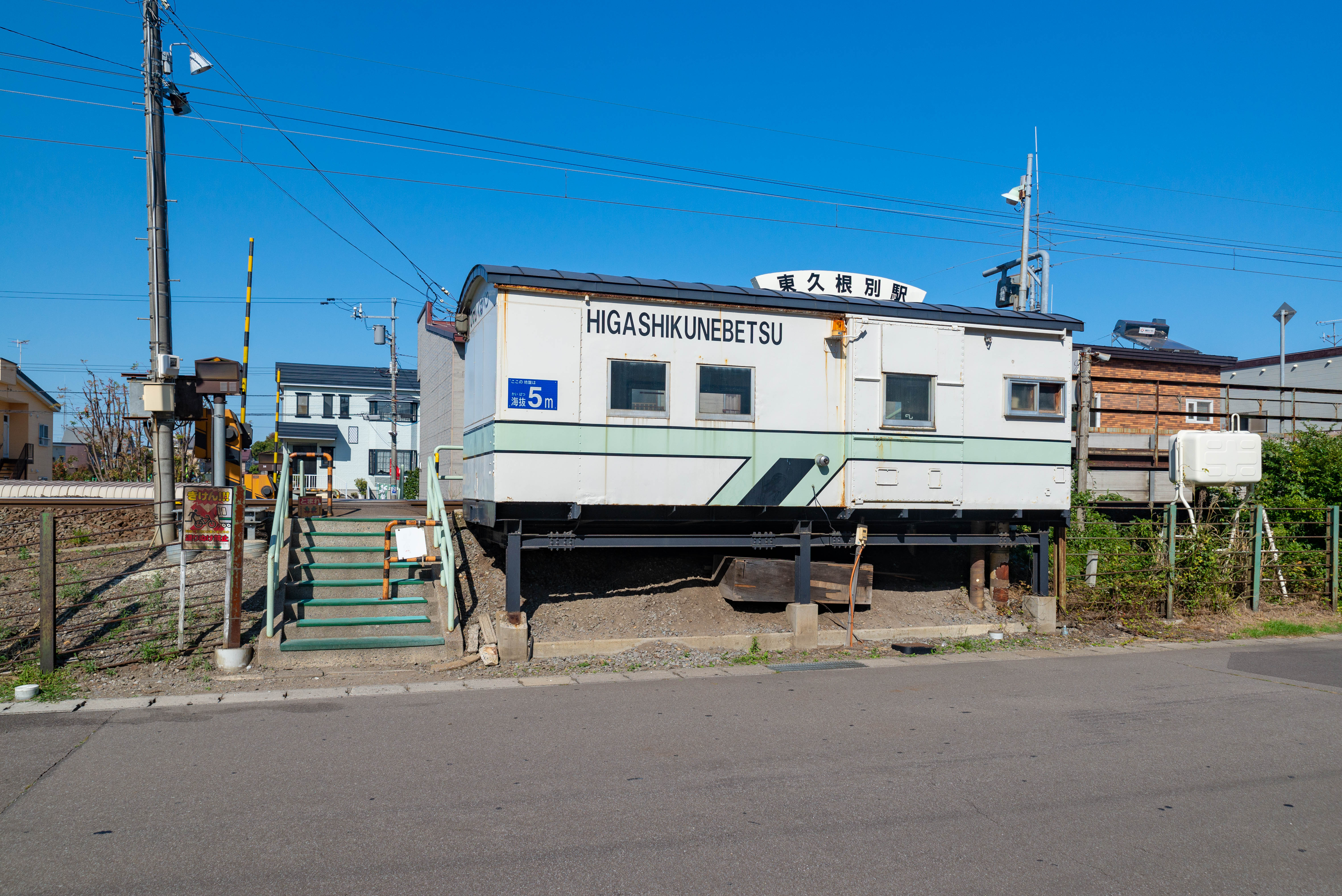
- Higashi-Kunebetsu Station in September 2014

General information
- Location: Hokuto, Hokkaido; Japan
- Coordinates: 41°49′35″N 140°40′47″E
- Operator: South Hokkaido Railway Company
- Line: South Hokkaido Railway Line
- Distance: 5.3 km (3.3 mi) from Goryōkaku
- Platforms: 1 side platform
- Tracks: 1

Other information
- Station code: sh10

History
- Opened: 1 November 1986; 39 years ago

Services
Preceding station	South Hokkaido Railway Company	Following station
Kunebetsu towards Kikonai	South Hokkaido Railway Line	Nanaehama towards Hakodate
Location
- Location within Hokkaido Location within Japan

Higashi-Kunebetsu Station (Japanese: 東久根別駅, Hepburn: Higashi-Kunebetsu-eki) is a railway station on the South Hokkaido Railway Line in Hokuto, Hokkaido, Japan, operated by South Hokkaido Railway Company.

== Lines ==
Higashi-Kunebetsu Station is served by the 37.8 km South Hokkaido Railway Line between Goryōkaku and Kikonai.

== Station layout ==
The station has one side platform serving a single bidirectional track.

== History ==
Higashi-Kunebetsu Station on the Esashi Line opened on 1 November 1986. With the privatization of JNR on 1 April 1987, the station came under the control of JR Hokkaido.

Operations on the Esashi Line were transferred from JR Hokkaido to South Hokkaido Railway Company when the Hokkaido Shinkansen opened on 26 March 2016.

== See also ==
- List of railway stations in Japan
