= Yoshibori Station =

Former railway station in Kikonai, Hokkaido, Japan

Coordinates: 41.6846°N 140.3791°E

Yoshibori Station 吉堀駅
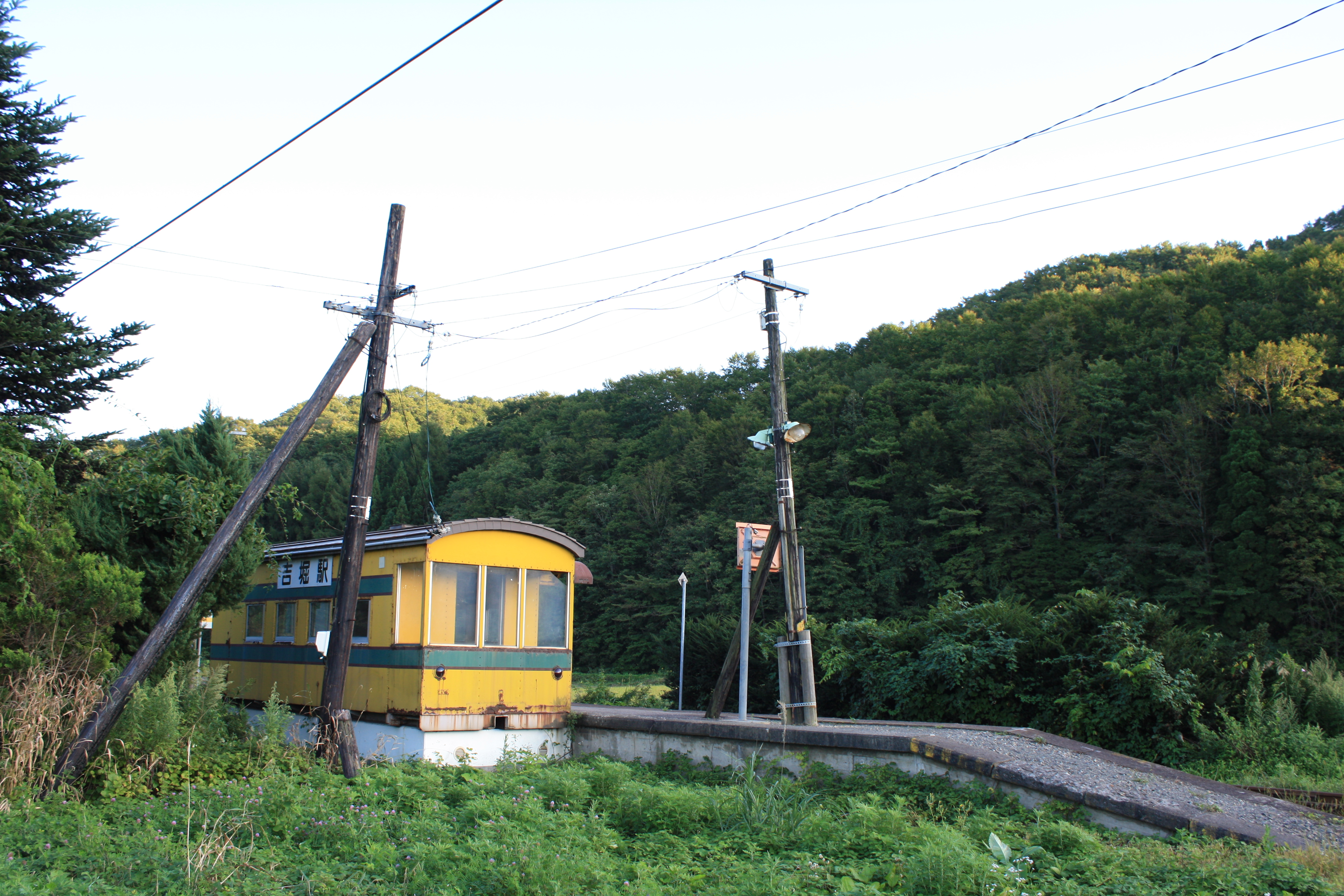
- Yoshibori Station in September 2008

General information
- Location: Ōkawa, Kikonai, Kamiiso District, Hokkaido; Japan
- Operator: JR Hokkaido
- Line: Esashi Line
- Platforms: 1 side platform
- Tracks: 1

History
- Opened: 10 December 1935
- Closed: May 2014
Location
- Location within Hokkaido Location within Japan

Yoshibori Station (吉堀駅, Yoshibori-eki) was a railway station on the Esashi Line in Kikonai, Hokkaido, Japan, operated by Hokkaido Railway Company (JR Hokkaido). It opened in 1935 and closed in May 2014.

== Lines ==
Yoshibori Station was served by the non-electrified section of the Esashi Line between Kikonai and Esashi.

== Station layout ==
The station consisted of a single side platform serving a bidirectional single track.

== Adjacent stations ==
«	Service	»
Esashi Line
Oshima-Tsuruoka	Local	Shinmei

== History ==
Yoshibori Station opened on 10 December 1935. With the privatization of JNR on 1 April 1987, the station came under the control of JR Hokkaido. The station closed in 2014, with the last services on the line running on 11 May.

== See also ==
- List of railway stations in Japan
