= Satsukari Station =

Railway station in Kikonai, Hokkaido, Japan

Satsukari Station 札苅駅
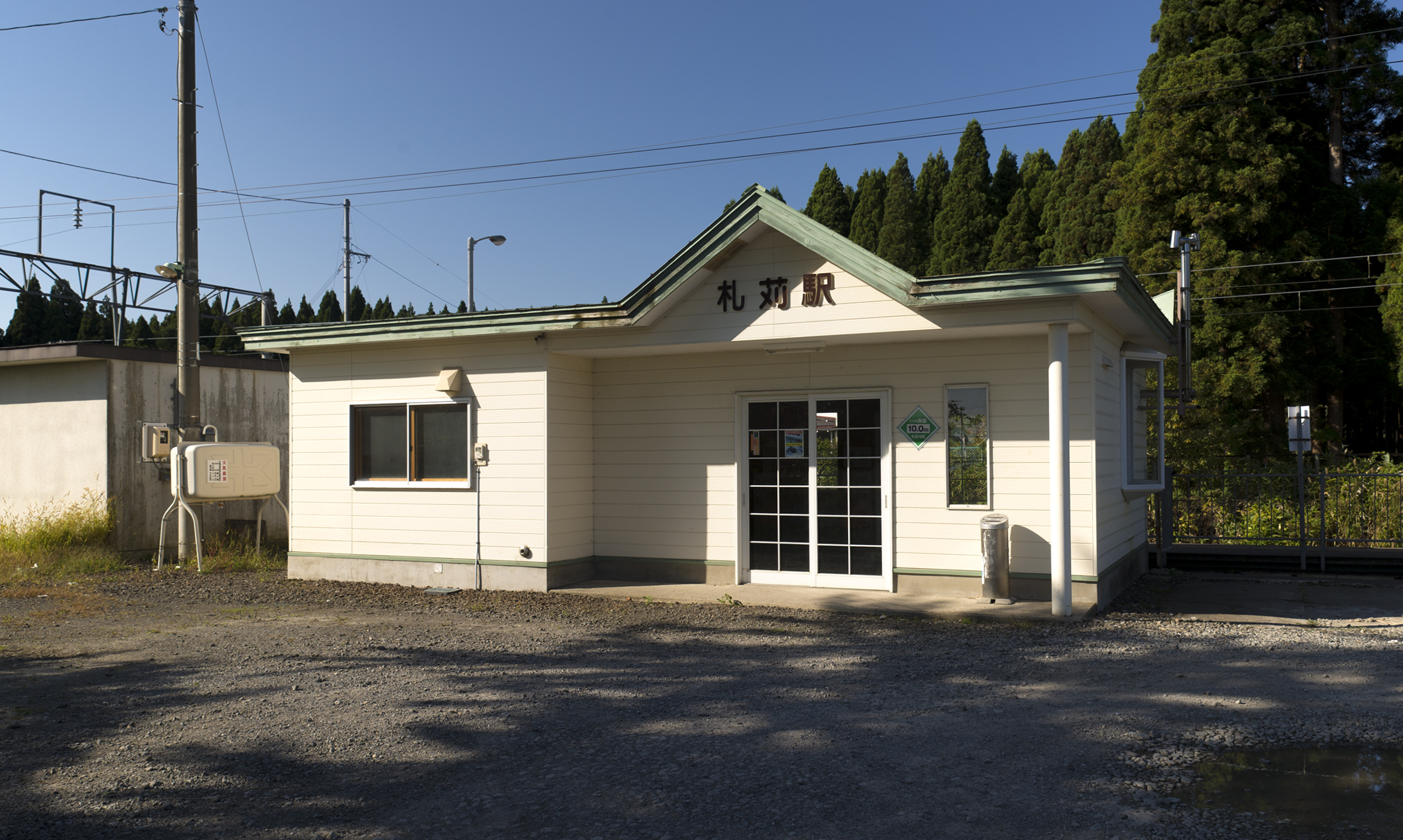
- Satsukari Station, September 2014

General information
- Location: Kikonai, Hokkaido; Japan
- Coordinates: 41°42′00″N 140°28′07″E
- Operator: South Hokkaido Railway Company
- Line: South Hokkaido Railway Line
- Distance: 34.0 km (21.1 mi) from Goryōkaku
- Platforms: 2 side platforms
- Tracks: 2

Other information
- Station code: sh02

History
- Opened: 25 October 1930; 95 years ago

Services
Preceding station	South Hokkaido Railway Company	Following station
Kikonai Terminus	South Hokkaido Railway Line	Izumisawa towards Hakodate
Location
- Location within Hokkaido Location within Japan

Satsukari Station (Japanese: 札苅駅, Hepburn: Satsukari-eki) is a railway station on the South Hokkaido Railway in Kikonai, Hokkaido, Japan, operated by South Hokkaido Railway Company.

== Lines ==
Satsukari Station is served by the 37.8 km South Hokkaido Railway between Goryōkaku and Kikonai.

== History ==
Satsukari Station on the Esashi Line opened on 25 October 1930. With the privatization of JNR on 1 April 1987, the station came under the control of JR Hokkaido.

Operations on the Esashi Line were transferred from JR Hokkaido to South Hokkaido Railway Company when the Hokkaido Shinkansen opened on 26 March 2016.

== See also ==
- List of railway stations in Japan
