= Shimmei Station =

Shimmei Station (神明駅) may refer to either of the following railway stations in Japan:

- Shimmei Station (Fukui) of Fukui Railway
- Shimmei Station (Hokkaido) of JR Hokkaido
- Shima-Shimmei Station of Kintetsu
