= Nanaehama Station =

Railway station in Hokuto, Hokkaido, Japan

Nanaehama Station 七重浜駅
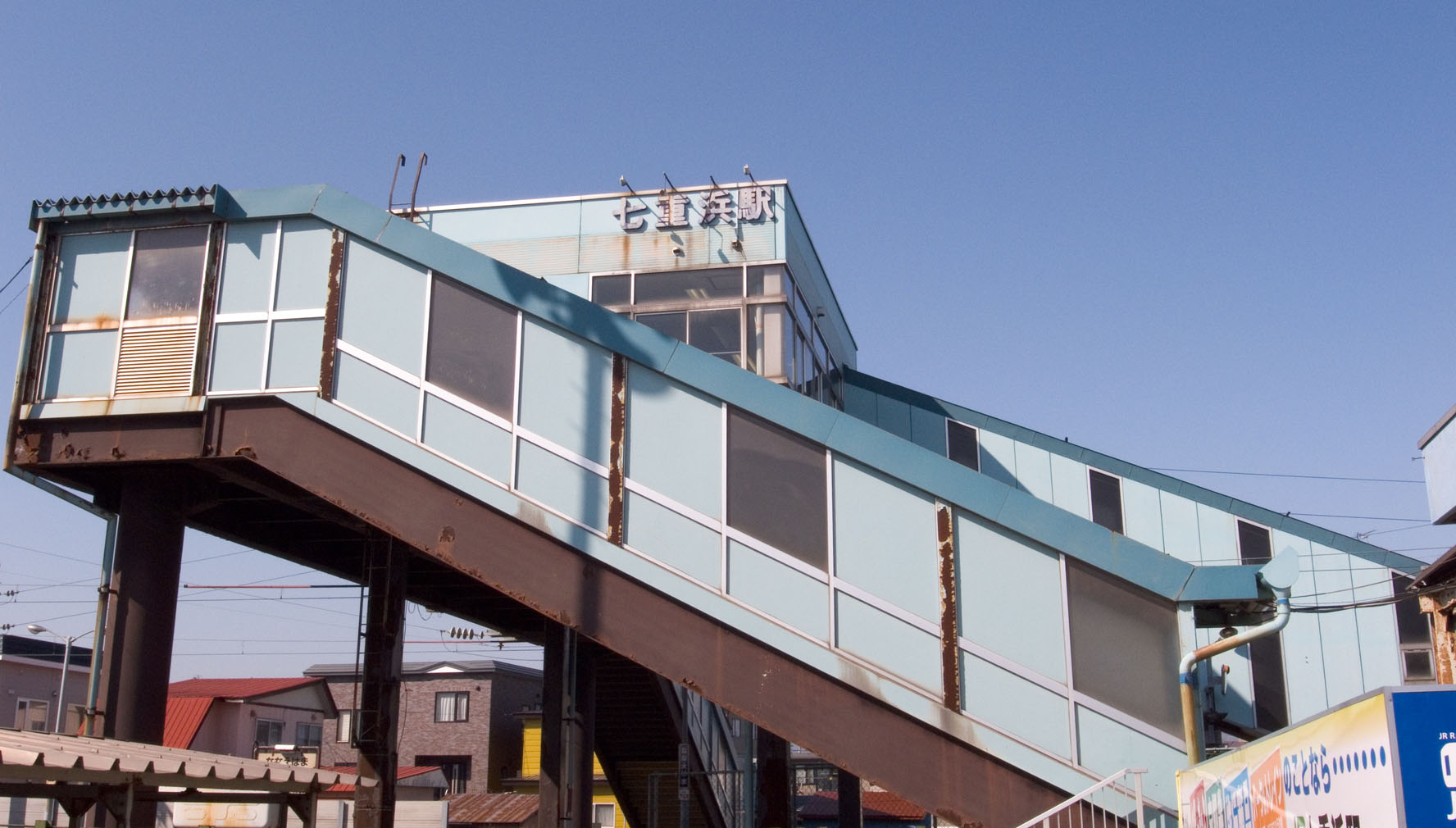
- Nanaehama Station in May 2009

General information
- Location: Hokuto, Hokkaido; Japan
- Coordinates: 41°49′03″N 140°42′30″E
- Operator: South Hokkaido Railway Company
- Line: South Hokkaido Railway Line
- Distance: 2.7 km (1.7 mi) from Goryōkaku
- Platforms: 1 island platform
- Tracks: 2

Other information
- Station code: sh11

History
- Opened: 21 June 1926

Services
Preceding station	South Hokkaido Railway Company	Following station
Higashi-Kunebetsu towards Kikonai	South Hokkaido Railway Line	Goryōkaku towards Hakodate
Location
- Location within Hokkaido Location within Japan

Nanaehama Station (Japanese: 七重浜駅, Hepburn: Nanaehama-eki) is a railway station on the South Hokkaido Railway Line in Hokuto, Hokkaido, Japan, operated by South Hokkaido Railway Company.

== Lines ==
Nanaehama Station is served by the 37.8 km South Hokkaido Railway Line between Goryōkaku and Kikonai.

== Station layout ==
The station has one island platform serving two tracks.

== History ==
Nanaehama Station on the Esashi Line opened on 21 June 1926. With the privatization of JNR on 1 April 1987, the station came under the control of JR Hokkaido.

Operations on the Esashi Line were transferred from JR Hokkaido to South Hokkaido Railway Company when the Hokkaido Shinkansen opened on 26 March 2016.

== Surrounding area ==
- Nanaehama Post Office
- National Route 227
- National Route 228

== See also ==
- List of railway stations in Japan
