= South Hokkaido Railway Company =

Railway company in Hokkaido, Japan

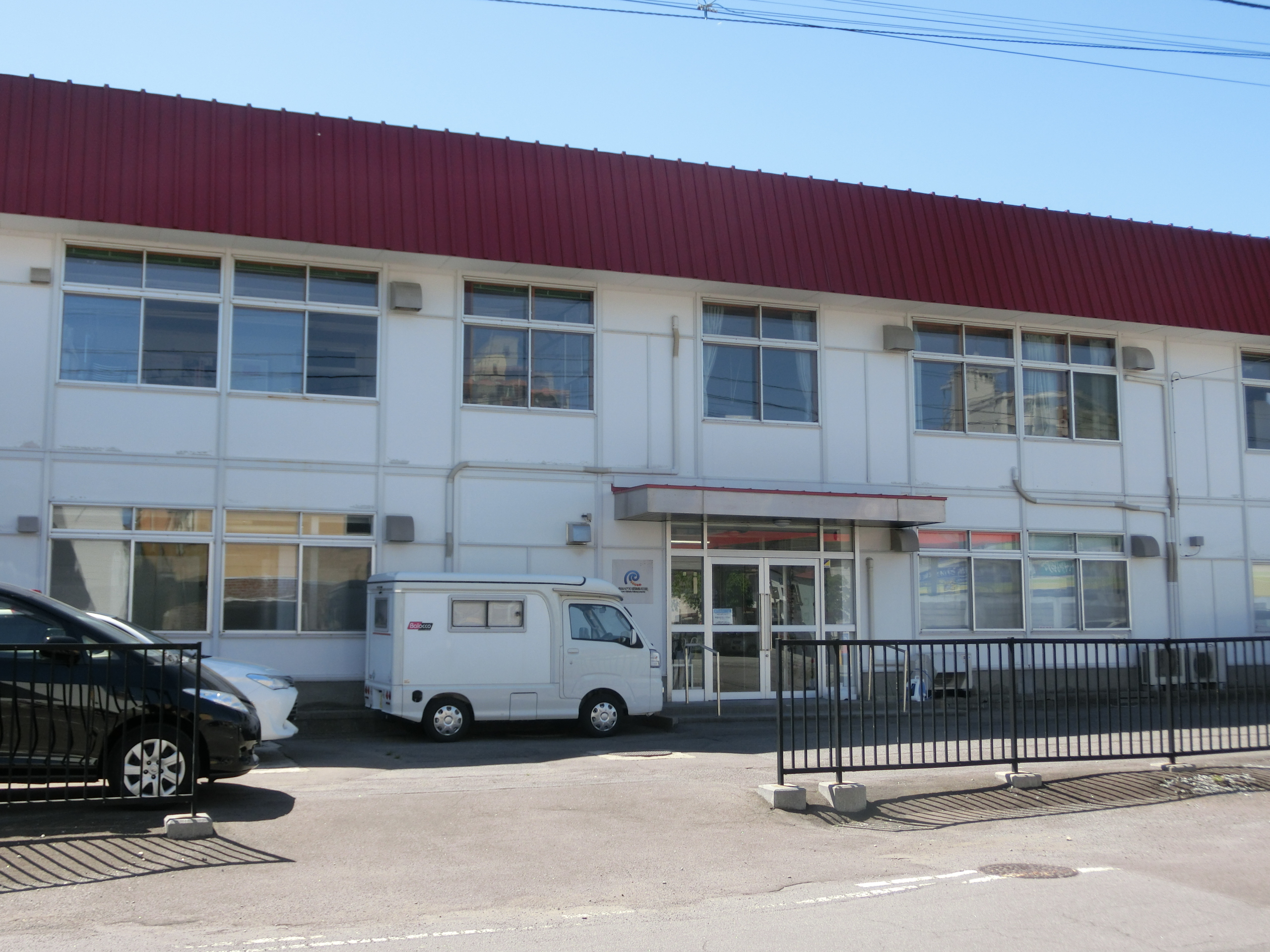
- South Hokkaido Railway Head Office
- Native name: 道南いさりび鉄道
- Type: Third-sector
- Industry: Rail transport
- Founded: 24 December 2014
- Headquarters: Hakodate, Hokkaido, Japan
- Area served: Hokkaido
- Owner: Hokkaido (80%); Hokuto (11.2%); Hakodate (4.4%); Kikonai (4.4%)
- Website: shr-isaribi.jp/english

The South Hokkaido Railway Company (Japanese: 道南いさりび鉄道株式会社, Hepburn: Dōnan Isaribi Tetsudō Kabushikigaisha) is a third-sector railway company based in Hakodate, Hokkaido, Japan.

== Dōnan Isaribi Tetsudō Line ==
Dōnan Isaribi Tetsudō Line
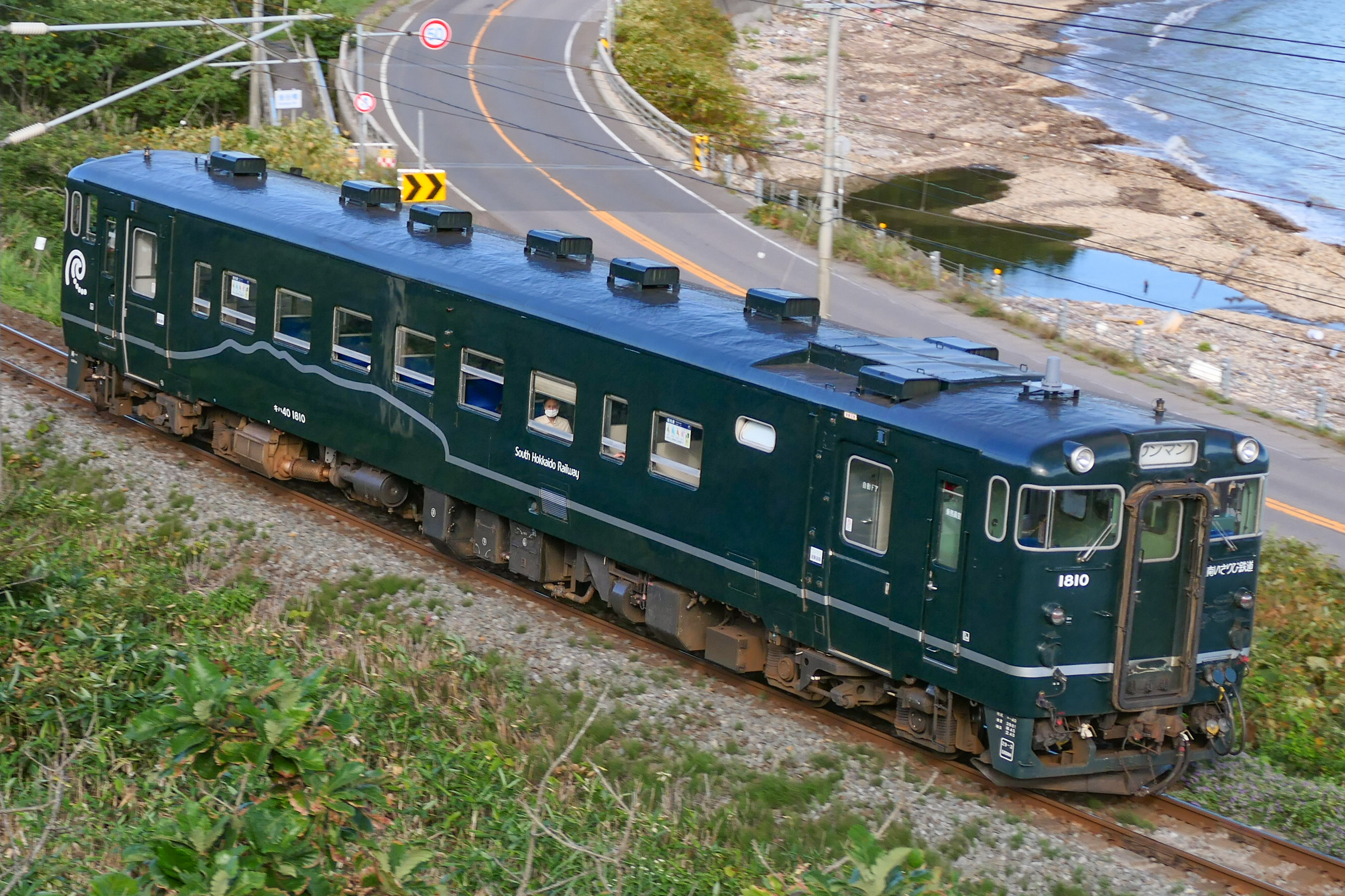
- Diesel railcar type KiHa 40 running on the Dōnan Isaribi Tetsudō Line (September 2022)

Overview
- Native name: 道南いさりび鉄道線
- Locale: Hokkaido
- Termini: Goryōkaku; Kikonai
- Stations: 12

Service
- Type: Regional rail
- Rolling stock: KiHa 40 series

Technical
- Line length: 37.8 km (23.5 mi)
- Number of tracks: 1
- Track gauge: 1,067 mm (3 ft 6 in)
- Electrification: Overhead line: 20 kV 50 Hz AC; 25 kV 50 Hz AC (Kikonai area)
Route map

The company took control of passenger operations on the Hokkaido Railway Company (JR Hokkaido) Esashi Line between Kikonai and Goryōkaku following the commencement of operations of the Hokkaido Shinkansen on 26 March 2016. The line was then renamed the Dōnan Isaribi Tetsudō Line (道南いさりび鉄道線).

=== Services ===
All services on the line are local trains, stopping at every station.

Trains operate between Hakodate (on the Hakodate Main Line), Goryōkaku, and Kamiiso approximately every hour, with some extra services during peak hours. Nearly every second train continues through to Kikonai, i.e. trains run approximately every two hours over the full length of the line.

=== Stations ===
All stations are in Hokkaido.
Track: ∥: Double track, ∨: Double track ends, ◇: Passing loop |: No passing loop

No.	Station	Between (km)	Distance from Goryōkaku (km)	Transfers	Track	Location
H75	Hakodate	—N/a	3.4	Hakodate Main Line; Hakodate City Tram: ■ Route 2, ■ Route 5 (at Hakodate-Ekimae)	∥	Hakodate
↑ All trains operate through service to/from Hakodate via the Hakodate Main Line ↑
H74	Goryōkaku	3.4	0.0	Hakodate Main Line	∨	Hakodate
sh11	Nanaehama	2.7	2.7		◇	Hokuto
sh10	Higashi-Kunebetsu	2.6	5.3		｜	Hokuto
sh09	Kunebetsu	1.2	6.5		◇	Hokuto
sh08	Kiyokawaguchi	1.1	7.6		｜	Hokuto
sh07	Kamiiso	1.2	8.8		◇	Hokuto
sh06	Moheji	8.8	17.6		◇	Hokuto
sh05	Oshima-Tōbetsu	5.0	22.6		◇	Hokuto
sh04	Kamaya	4.9	27.5		◇	Kikonai
sh03	Izumisawa	3.1	30.6		◇	Kikonai
sh02	Satsukari	3.4	34.0		◇	Kikonai
sh01	Kikonai	3.8	37.8	Hokkaido Shinkansen; Kaikyō Line	◇	Kikonai

== Sightseeing Train ==
The company refurbished KiHa 40 car 1793 to operate sightseeing train Nagamare Kaikyo. Operating on the 2nd and 4th Saturday of each month, it departs from Hakodate Station at 15:50 and makes stops at Kamiiso, Kikonai and Moheji before returning to Hakodate at 20:00. Round-trip train travel, food and drink are included in the ticket price.

== Rolling stock ==
As of 1 April 2016, the company operates a fleet of nine KiHa 40 series diesel multiple unit (DMU) trains formerly owned by JR Hokkaido.

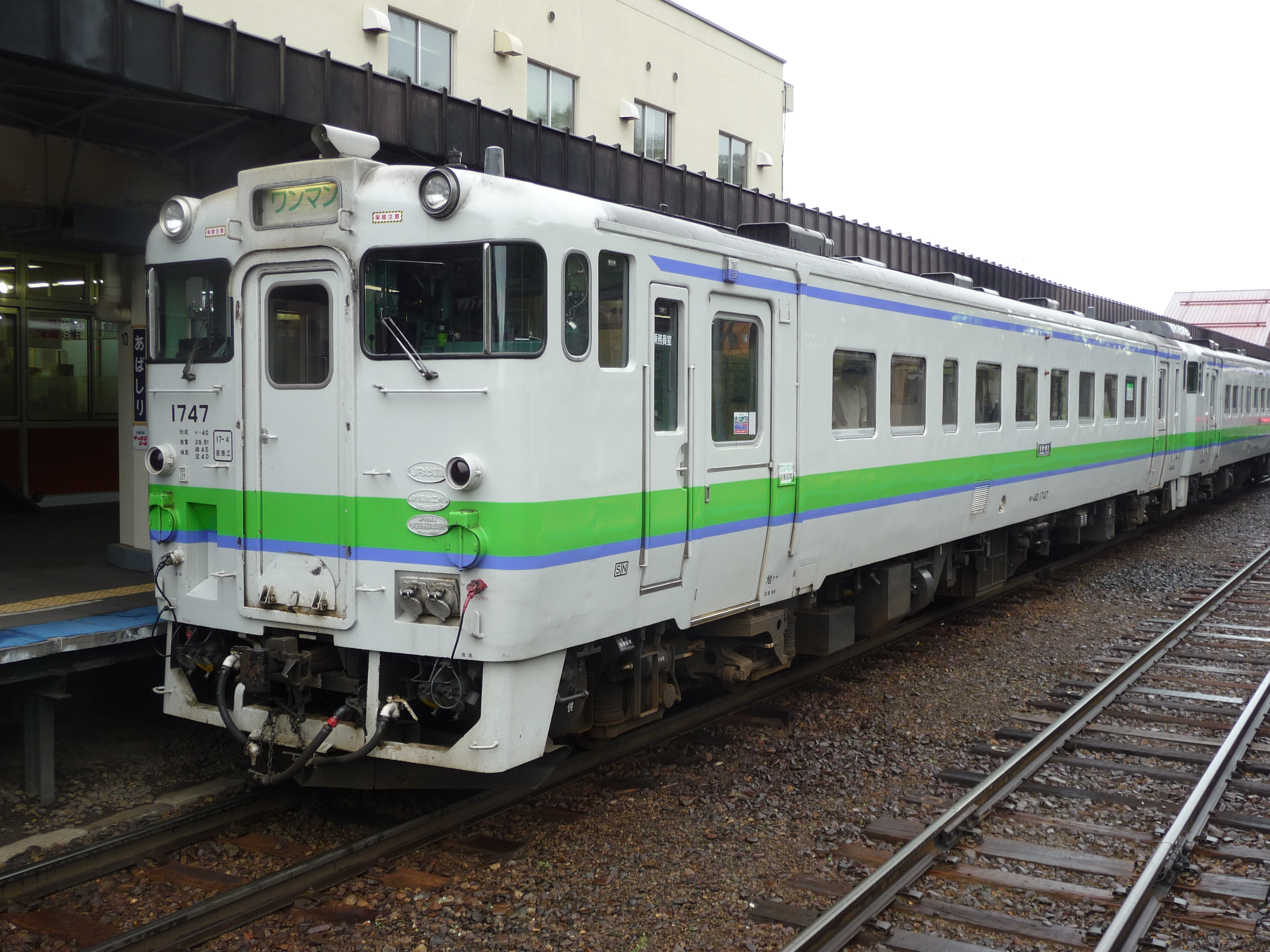
A KiHa 40 series unit in JR Hokkaido livery

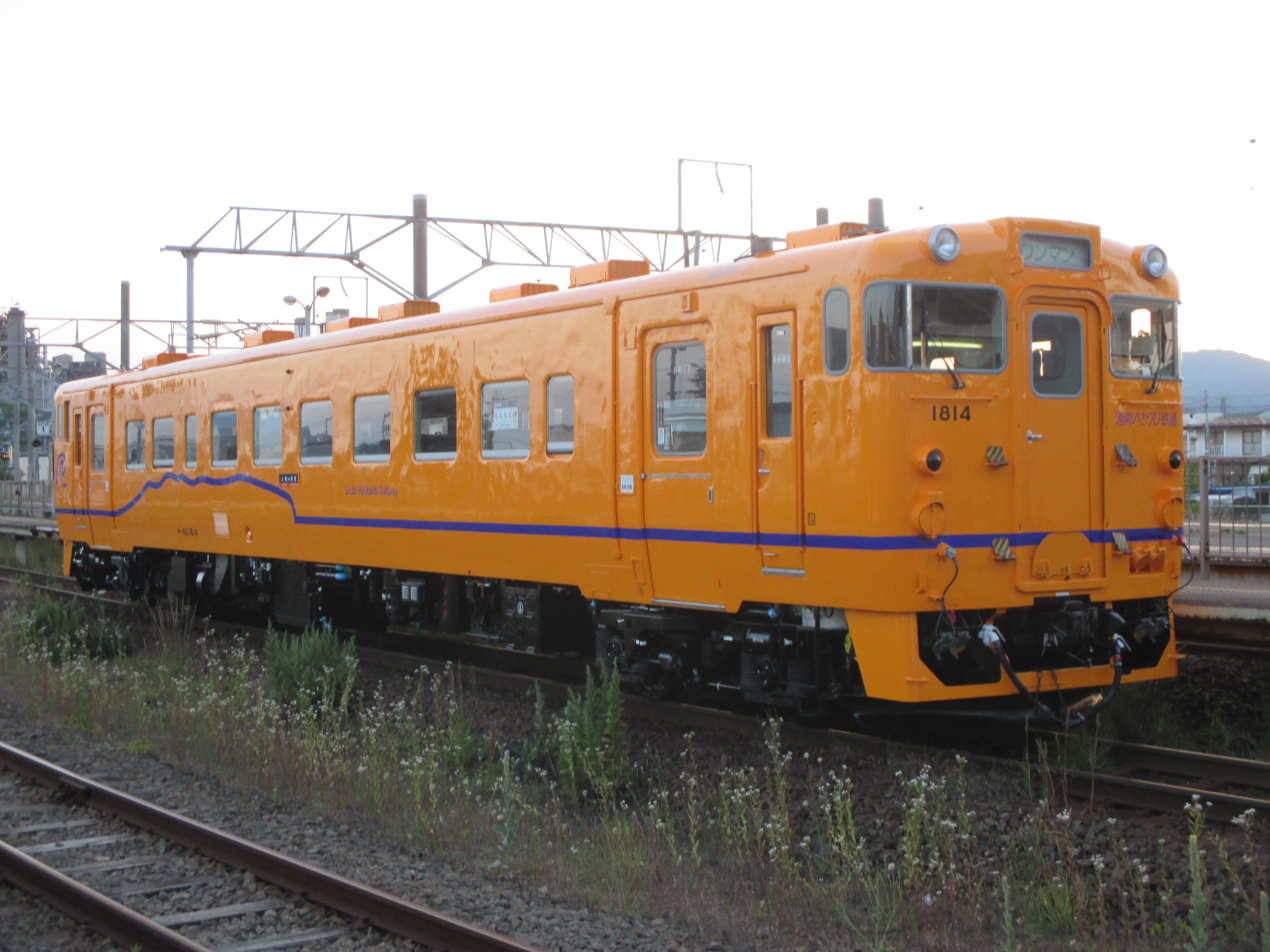
KiHa 40-1814 in new yellow livery in July 2016

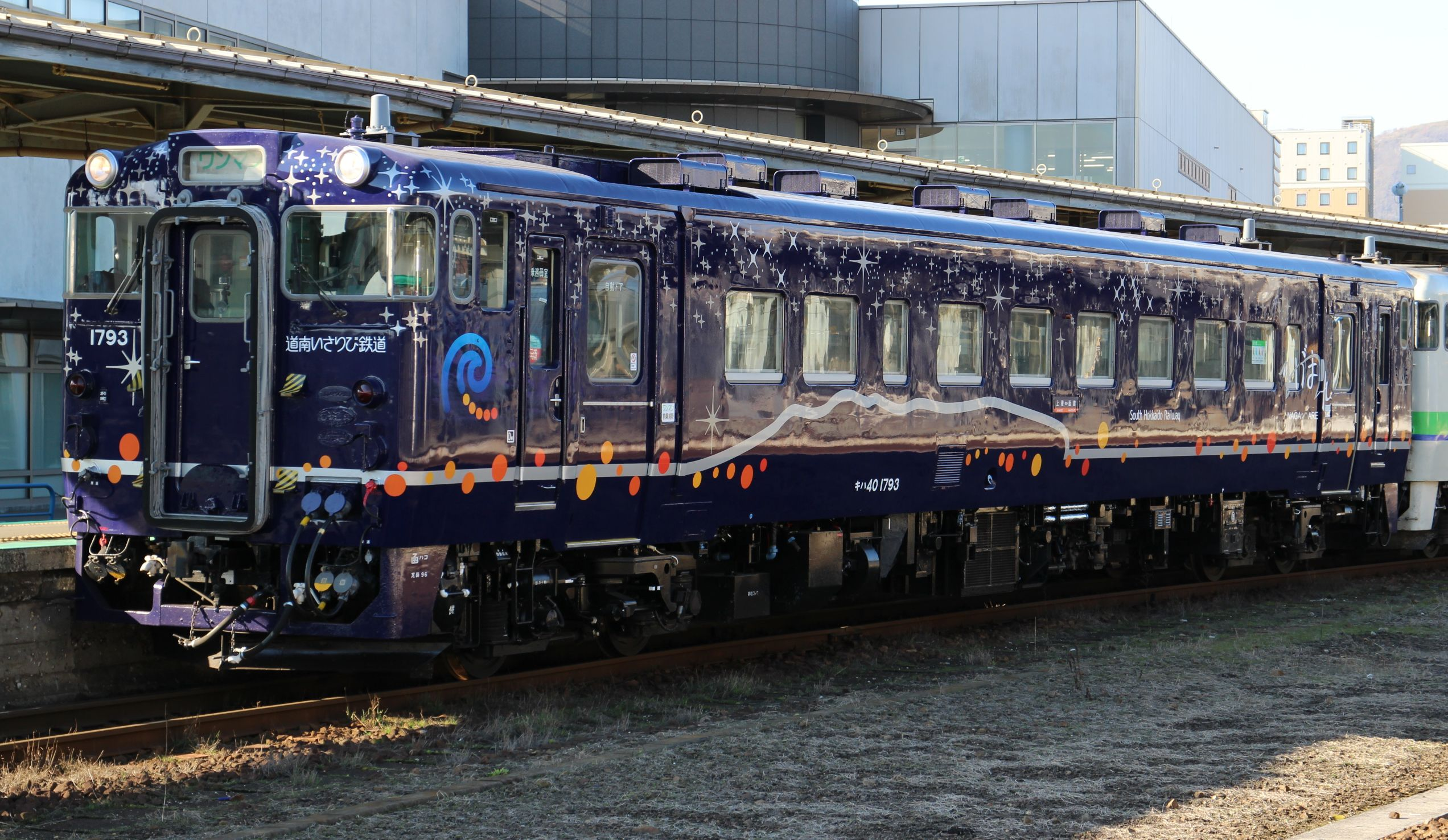
KiHa 40-1793 in Nagamare livery in April 2016

== History ==
The company was established on July 21, 2005 as the Hokkaidō Dōnan Chiiki Heikō Zairaisen Junbi Kabushikigaisha (北海道道南地域並行在来線準備株式会社). On December 24, 2014, the current name was announced. On March 22, 2015, the logo was unveiled. Revenue service commenced in March 2016, in conjunction with the opening of the Hokkaido Shinkansen.
