= Shinmei Station (Hokkaido) =

Former railway station in Kaminokuni, Hokkaido, Japan

Coordinates: 41°44′04″N 140°15′57″E

Shinmei Station 神明駅
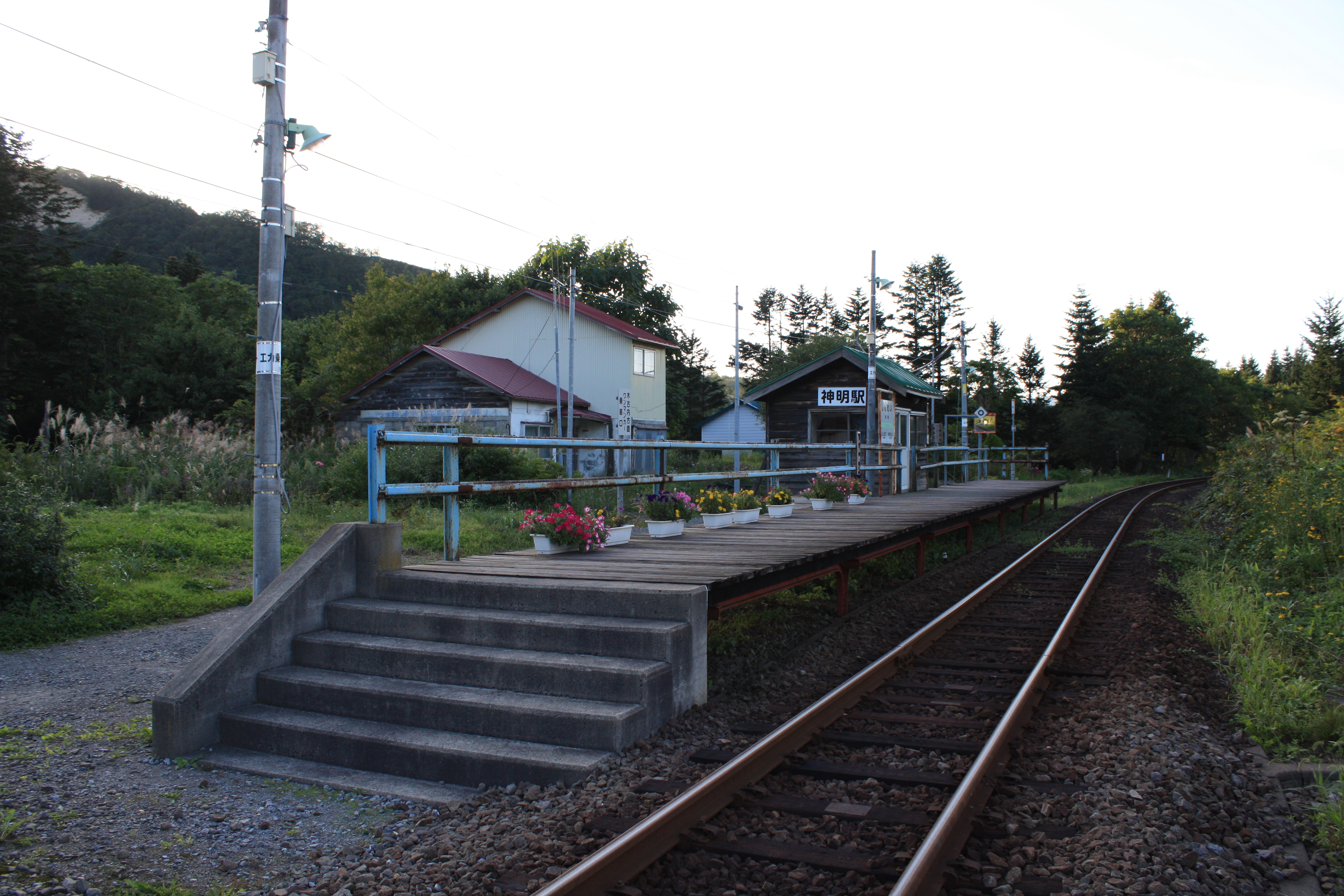
- Shinmei Station in September 2008

General information
- Location: Yunotai, Kaminokuni, Hiyama District, Hokkaido; Japan
- Operator: JR Hokkaido
- Line: Esashi Line
- Platforms: 1 side platform
- Tracks: 1

History
- Opened: 25 January 1957
- Closed: May 2014
Location
- Location within Hokkaido Location within Japan

Shinmei Station (神明駅, Shinmei-eki) was a railway station on the Esashi Line in Kaminokuni, Hokkaido, Japan, operated by Hokkaido Railway Company (JR Hokkaido). It opened in 1957 and closed in May 2014.

== Lines ==
Shinmei Station was served by the non-electrified section of the Esashi Line between Kikonai and Esashi.

== Station layout ==
The station consisted of a single side platform serving a bidirectional single track.

== Adjacent stations ==
«	Service	»
Esashi Line
Yoshibori	Local	Yunotai

== History ==
Shinmei Station opened on 25 January 1957. With the privatization of JNR on 1 April 1987, the station came under the control of JR Hokkaido. The station closed in 2014, with the last services on the line running on 11 May.

== See also ==
- List of railway stations in Japan
