= Hokuto, Hokkaido =

Hokuto 北斗市
- City
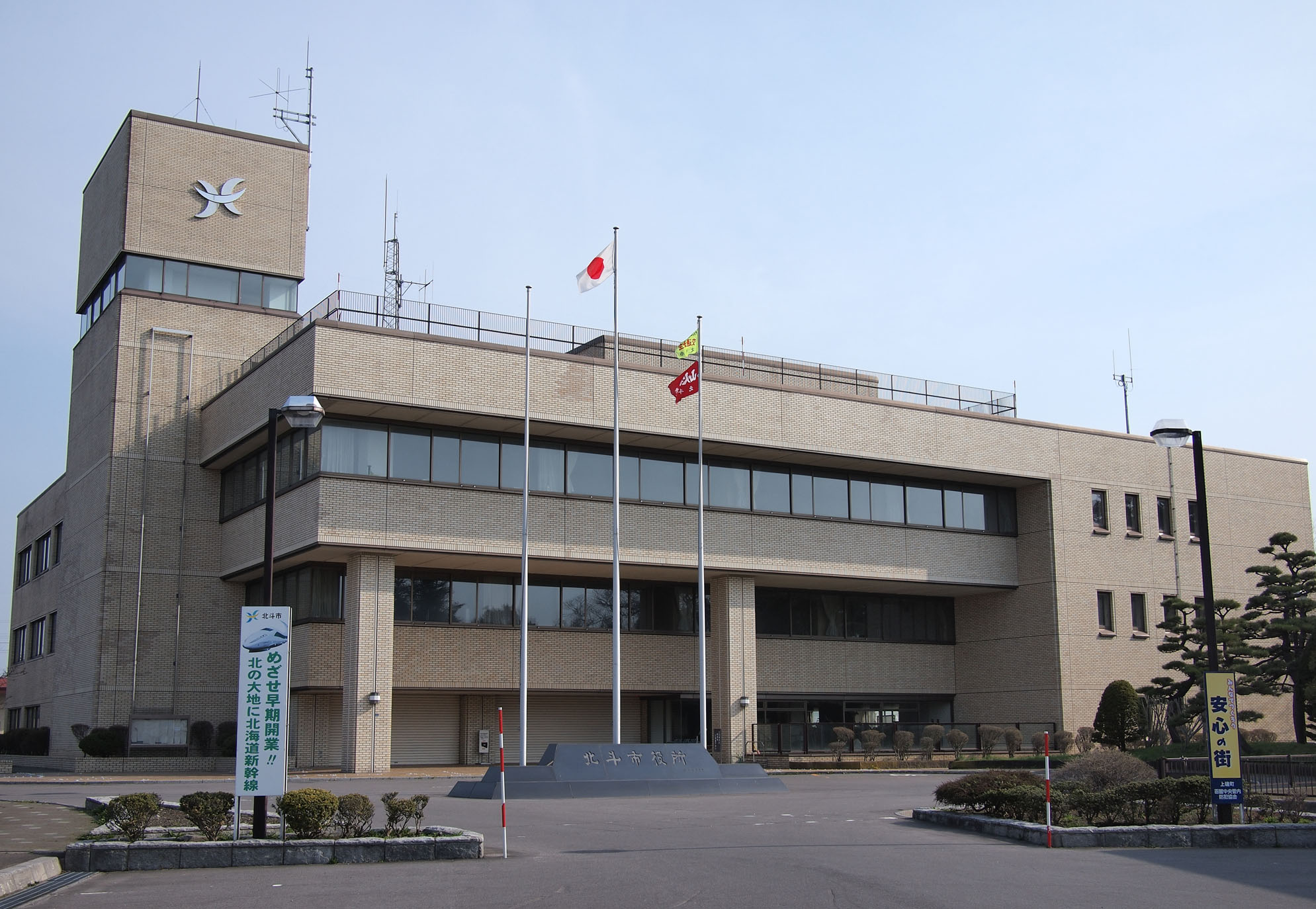
- Hokuto City Hall

- Flag Emblem

- Location of Hokuto in Hokkaido (Oshima Subprefecture)

- Location in Japan
- Coordinates: 41°49′27″N 140°39′10″E
- Country: Japan
- Region: Hokkaido
- Prefecture: Hokkaido (Oshima Subprefecture)

Government
  - Mayor: Toshimine Takaya

Area
  - Total: 397.29 km^{2} (153.39 sq mi)

Population (March 1, 2020)
  - Total: 46,083
  - Density: 115.99/km^{2} (300.42/sq mi)
- Time zone: UTC+09:00 (JST)
- City hall address: 1-3-10 Chūō, Hokuto-shi, Hokkaidō; 049-0192
- Climate: Dfb
- Website: www.city.hokuto.hokkaido.jp
- Symbols
- Flower: Spring: Sakura; Summer: Marigold; Autumn: Mukuge
- Mascot: Zushihocky
- Tree: Japanese Black Pine and Japanese beech

Hokuto (北斗市, Hokuto-shi) is a city in the center of the Oshima Subprefecture in Japan's northern island of Hokkaido. It serves as a bedroom community for Hakodate, to the east of the city. Hokuto was formed on February 1, 2006, from merging the town of Kamiiso, from Kamiiso District, and the town of Ōno, from Kameda District. Hokuto is the third city to be established in Oshima. (The second, Kameda, no longer exists, being dissolved just two years after its founding in 1971). Hokuto is the second largest city in Oshima by population after the city of Hakodate.

== Geography ==
Hokuto is in the middle of Oshima, a peninsula in Hokkaido's south. The southeast portion is mostly plains and the western part is more mountainous. The south borders the Hakodate Bay. The Ōno River runs north and south through the middle of Hokuto.

- Mountain: Katsuratake (734m)
- Rivers: Ōno, Hekirichi
- Lake: Kamiiso
- Forest parks: Hachirounuma Koen

=== Neighboring regions ===
- Oshima Subprefecture
  - Hakodate City
  - Kamiiso District: Kikonai Town
  - Kameda District: Nanae Town
  - Kayabe District: Mori Town
- Hiyama Subprefecture
  - Hiyama District: Assabu Town

== Climate ==
Climate data for Hokuto (elevation 25 m, 1991–2020 normals, extremes 1977–present)
Month	Jan	Feb	Mar	Apr	May	Jun	Jul	Aug	Sep	Oct	Nov	Dec	Year
Record high °C (°F)	11.5 (52.7)	14.5 (58.1)	16.8 (62.2)	25.1 (77.2)	28.2 (82.8)	30.0 (86.0)	33.6 (92.5)	34.5 (94.1)	32.5 (90.5)	28.2 (82.8)	24.0 (75.2)	16.3 (61.3)	34.5 (94.1)
Mean daily maximum °C (°F)	0.2 (32.4)	1.0 (33.8)	5.0 (41.0)	11.6 (52.9)	16.9 (62.4)	20.5 (68.9)	23.9 (75.0)	25.8 (78.4)	22.9 (73.2)	16.7 (62.1)	9.3 (48.7)	2.4 (36.3)	13.0 (55.4)
Daily mean °C (°F)	−3.5 (25.7)	−2.9 (26.8)	0.9 (33.6)	6.6 (43.9)	11.8 (53.2)	15.9 (60.6)	19.8 (67.6)	21.5 (70.7)	18.0 (64.4)	11.5 (52.7)	5.0 (41.0)	−1.2 (29.8)	8.6 (47.5)
Mean daily minimum °C (°F)	−8.1 (17.4)	−7.8 (18.0)	−3.7 (25.3)	1.5 (34.7)	7.0 (44.6)	11.9 (53.4)	16.6 (61.9)	17.9 (64.2)	13.4 (56.1)	6.3 (43.3)	0.6 (33.1)	−5.2 (22.6)	4.2 (39.6)
Record low °C (°F)	−19.6 (−3.3)	−19.4 (−2.9)	−16.1 (3.0)	−10.8 (12.6)	−1.2 (29.8)	4.0 (39.2)	8.4 (47.1)	9.2 (48.6)	2.0 (35.6)	−3.3 (26.1)	−14.8 (5.4)	−18.6 (−1.5)	−19.6 (−3.3)
Average precipitation mm (inches)	67.0 (2.64)	55.8 (2.20)	56.1 (2.21)	68.6 (2.70)	86.4 (3.40)	79.8 (3.14)	129.5 (5.10)	158.5 (6.24)	142.6 (5.61)	111.7 (4.40)	106.2 (4.18)	87.5 (3.44)	1,149.6 (45.26)
Average precipitation days (≥ 1.0 mm)	14.8	12.3	12.2	10.1	10.3	8.3	9.6	9.4	11.0	12.1	14.3	16.1	140.6
Mean monthly sunshine hours	66.8	83.1	133.5	172.2	189.2	161.7	116.7	137.2	152.8	147.9	97.0	63.5	1,526.1
Source: Japan Meteorological Agency (1991–2020 normals, extremes 1977–present)

== History ==
- 1900: Kamiiso village and Ono village were founded.
- 1918: Kamiiso village became Kamiiso town.
- 1955: Mobetsu village was merged into Kamiiso town.
- 1957: Ono village became Ono town.
- 2006: Kamiiso town and Ono town were merged to form Hokuto city.

== Transportation ==
=== Rail ===
Hokkaido Railway Company (JR Hokkaido) - Hokkaido Shinkansen

- Shin-Hakodate-Hokuto

Hokkaido Railway Company (JR Hokkaido) - Hakodate Main Line

- Shin-Hakodate-Hokuto

South Hokkaido Railway Company - Dōnan Isaribi Tetsudō Line

- Nanaehama - Higashi-Kunebetsu - Kunebetsu - Kiyokawaguchi - Kamiiso - Moheji - Oshima-Tōbetsu

=== Road ===
- Hakodate-Esashi Expressway: Hokuto-Oiwake IC - Hokuto-chūō IC - Hokuto-Tomigawa IC - Hokuto-Moheji IC

== Education ==
=== High schools ===
- Hokkaido Kamiiso High School
- Hokkaido Ono Agricultural High School
- Hokkaido Hakodate fisheries High School
