= Kikonai, Hokkaido =

Town in Oshima Subprefecture, Hokkaido, Japan

Kikonai 木古内町
- Town
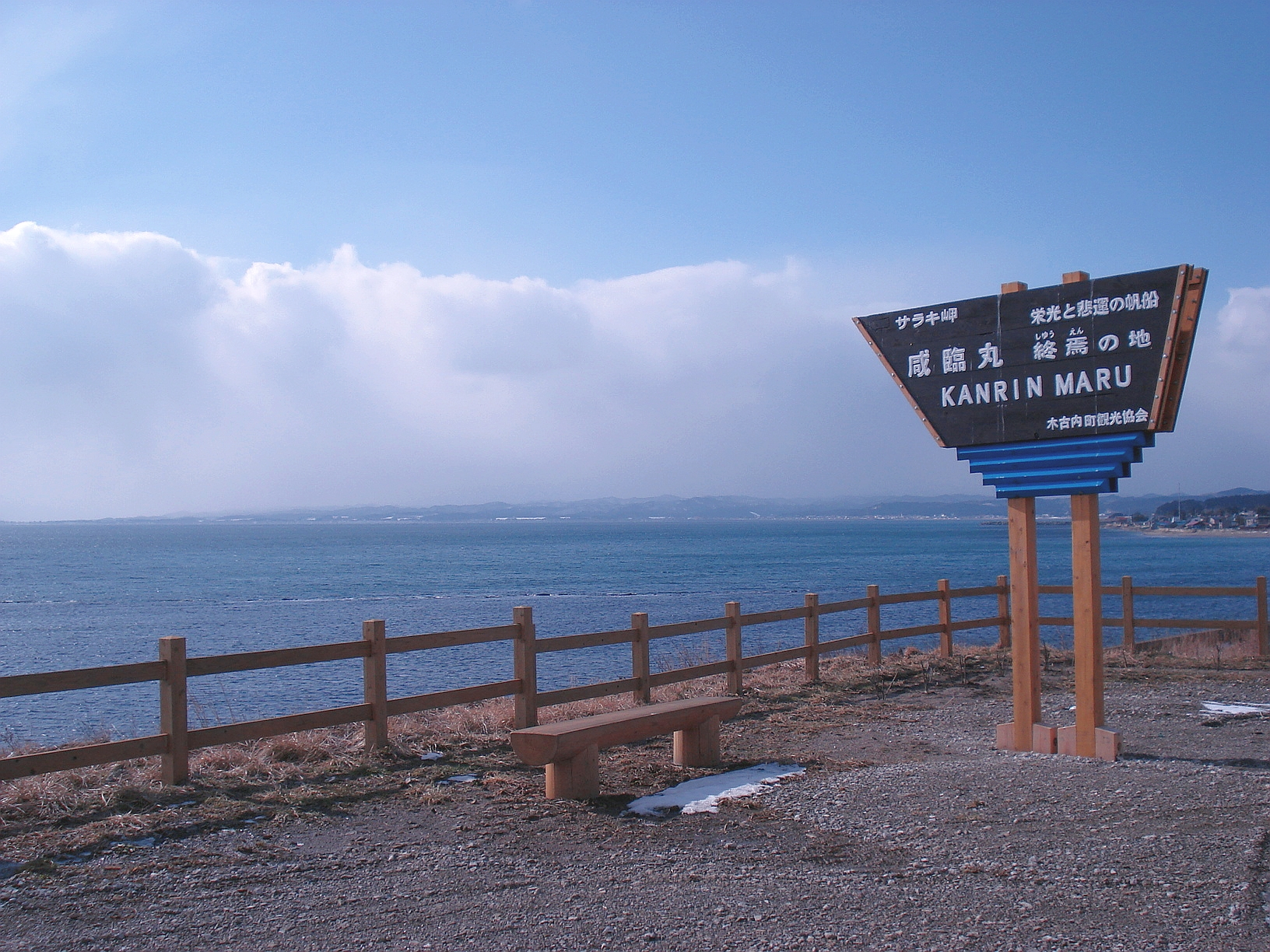
- Memorial Tablet for the Kanrin Maru Sinking at Saraki Point (February 2009)

- Flag Seal

- The location of Kikonai in Oshima Subprefecture.

- Location of Kikonai in Japan
- Coordinates: 41°41′N 140°26′E
- Country: Japan
- Prefecture: Hokkaido
- Subprefecture: Oshima Subprefecture
- District: Kamiiso
- Established: 1879

Government
  - Mayor: Isao Ōmori

Area
  - Total: 221.88 km^{2} (85.67 sq mi)

Population (2016-09-30)
  - Total: 4,448
  - Density: 20.05/km^{2} (51.92/sq mi)
- Post code: 049-0422
- Area code: 01392
- Government Office Address: 218 Banchi, Aza Hon-chō, Kikonai-chō, Kamiiso-gun, Hokkaidō 049-0422
- Government Office Telephone: 01392-2-3131
- Climate: Dfb
- Website: www.town.kikonai.hokkaido.jp
- Symbols
- Flower: Rhododendron
- Tree: Cryptomeria

Kikonai (木古内町, Kikonai-chō) is a town located in Oshima Subprefecture, Hokkaido, Japan.

As of September 2016, the town has an estimated population of 4,448, and a density of 20 persons per km^{2}. The total area is 221.88 km^{2}.

== Geography ==
Kikonai is located on the southwest of the Oshima Peninsula and faces Tsugaru Strait.

=== Neighboring towns ===
- Hiyama Subprefecture
  - Assabu
  - Kaminokuni
- Oshima Subprefecture
  - Hokuto
  - Shiriuchi

=== Climate ===
Climate data for Kikonai (1991−2020 normals, extremes 1977−present)
Month	Jan	Feb	Mar	Apr	May	Jun	Jul	Aug	Sep	Oct	Nov	Dec	Year
Record high °C (°F)	10.1 (50.2)	11.9 (53.4)	16.7 (62.1)	25.4 (77.7)	30.4 (86.7)	29.4 (84.9)	34.2 (93.6)	34.1 (93.4)	32.5 (90.5)	27.5 (81.5)	21.5 (70.7)	16.9 (62.4)	34.2 (93.6)
Mean daily maximum °C (°F)	0.9 (33.6)	1.7 (35.1)	5.5 (41.9)	11.4 (52.5)	15.9 (60.6)	18.8 (65.8)	22.7 (72.9)	25.1 (77.2)	22.9 (73.2)	17.0 (62.6)	9.9 (49.8)	3.1 (37.6)	12.9 (55.2)
Daily mean °C (°F)	−2.3 (27.9)	−1.8 (28.8)	1.5 (34.7)	6.7 (44.1)	11.4 (52.5)	15.1 (59.2)	19.4 (66.9)	21.6 (70.9)	18.3 (64.9)	12.0 (53.6)	5.6 (42.1)	−0.2 (31.6)	8.9 (48.1)
Mean daily minimum °C (°F)	−5.7 (21.7)	−5.4 (22.3)	−2.6 (27.3)	1.8 (35.2)	7.1 (44.8)	11.8 (53.2)	16.7 (62.1)	18.5 (65.3)	14.0 (57.2)	7.1 (44.8)	1.5 (34.7)	−3.4 (25.9)	5.1 (41.2)
Record low °C (°F)	−14.9 (5.2)	−15.6 (3.9)	−14.1 (6.6)	−9.1 (15.6)	−0.9 (30.4)	3.5 (38.3)	7.6 (45.7)	9.6 (49.3)	3.2 (37.8)	−1.1 (30.0)	−7.9 (17.8)	−13.0 (8.6)	−15.6 (3.9)
Average precipitation mm (inches)	96.9 (3.81)	79.8 (3.14)	72.7 (2.86)	76.1 (3.00)	87.4 (3.44)	87.7 (3.45)	132.7 (5.22)	159.9 (6.30)	153.8 (6.06)	110.2 (4.34)	122.4 (4.82)	120.8 (4.76)	1,293 (50.91)
Average rainy days	19.3	16.5	14.7	9.8	10.4	7.9	9.6	9.7	11.1	12.6	15.6	20.1	157.3
Mean monthly sunshine hours	85.7	97.8	158.7	194.8	192.1	150.4	123.3	149.2	165.8	165.1	103.8	80.7	1,667.4
Source 1: JMA
Source 2: JMA

== History ==
- 1902: Kikonai village was founded.
- 1942: Kikonai village became Kikonai town.
- 2012: Hokkaido Kikonai High School was closed.

== Transportation ==
Kikonai's station, Kikonai Station, is located at the north end of the Seikan Tunnel, which connects the islands of Hokkaido and Honshū. The town government is actively promoting the development of the Hokkaidō Shinkansen and proposes offering intermodal service on the line.

Matsumae Line used to run from Kikonai but it was abolished in 1988. The section of Esashi Line from Kikonai to Esashi was also abolished in May 2014.

- Esashi Line: Kamaya - Izumisawa - Satsukari - Kikonai ( - Oshima-Tsuruoka - Yoshibori)
- Kaikyō Line: Kikonai

== Sister city ==
- Tsuruoka, Yamagata, Japan (since 1989)
