= Kamiiso District, Hokkaido =

District in Hokkaido, Japan

Coordinates: 41.681°N 140.383°E

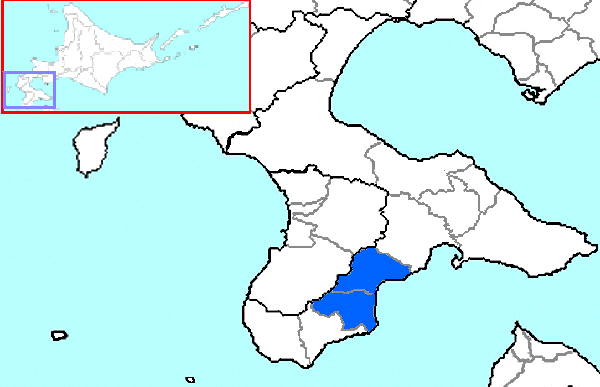
The area of Kamiiso District in Oshima Subprefecture.

Kamiiso (上磯郡, Kamiiso-gun) is a district located in Oshima Subprefecture, Hokkaido, Japan.

As of 2004, the district has an estimated population of 48,470 and a density of 71.18 persons per km^{2}. The total area is 680.95 km^{2}.

== Towns ==
- Kikonai
- Shiriuchi

== Merger ==
- On February 1, 2006, the town of Kamiiso merged with the town of Ōno, from Kameda District, to form the new city of Hokuto.
