= Goryōkaku Station =

Railway station in Hakodate, Hokkaido, Japan

Coordinates: 41.8042°N 140.7337°E

H74 Goryōkaku Station 五稜郭駅
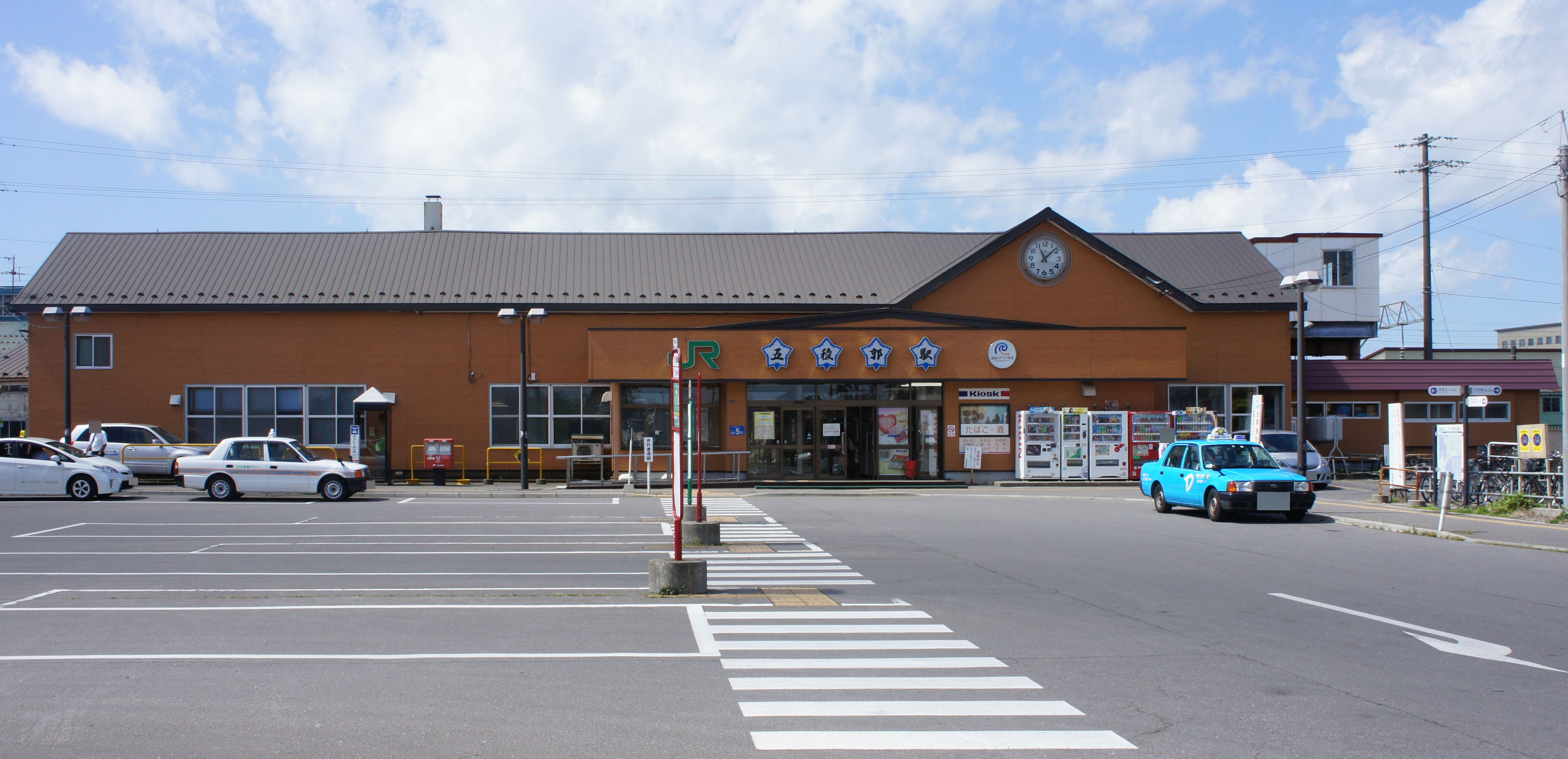
- Goryōkaku Station in August 2017

General information
- Location: 64-16 Kameda Honcho, Hakodate; Hokkaido Prefecture; Japan
- Operator: JR Hokkaido
- Lines: Hakodate Main Line; South Hokkaido Railway Line
- Connections: Bus stop

Other information
- Station code: H74

History
- Opened: 1 September 1911; 115 years ago

Services
Preceding station	JR Hokkaido	Following station
Hakodate Terminus	Hokuto	Shin-Hakodate-Hokuto towards Sapporo
Hakodate Terminus	Hakodate Main Line Rapid Hakodate Liner	Shin-Hakodate-Hokuto Terminus
Hakodate Terminus	Hakodate Main Line Local	Kikyō towards Asahikawa
Preceding station	South Hokkaido Railway Company	Following station
Hakodate Terminus	South Hokkaido Railway Line	Nanaehama towards Kikonai
Location
- Location within Hokkaido Location within Japan

Goryōkaku Station (Japanese: 五稜郭駅, Hepburn: Goryōkaku-eki) is a railway station on the Hakodate Main Line and South Hokkaido Railway Line in Hakodate, Hokkaido, Japan, operated by Hokkaido Railway Company (JR Hokkaido) and South Hokkaido Railway Company. The station is named after Goryōkaku fort, located about two kilometers from the station.

== Lines ==
Goryōkaku Station is served by the Hakodate Main Line and the South Hokkaido Railway Line.

== Station layout ==
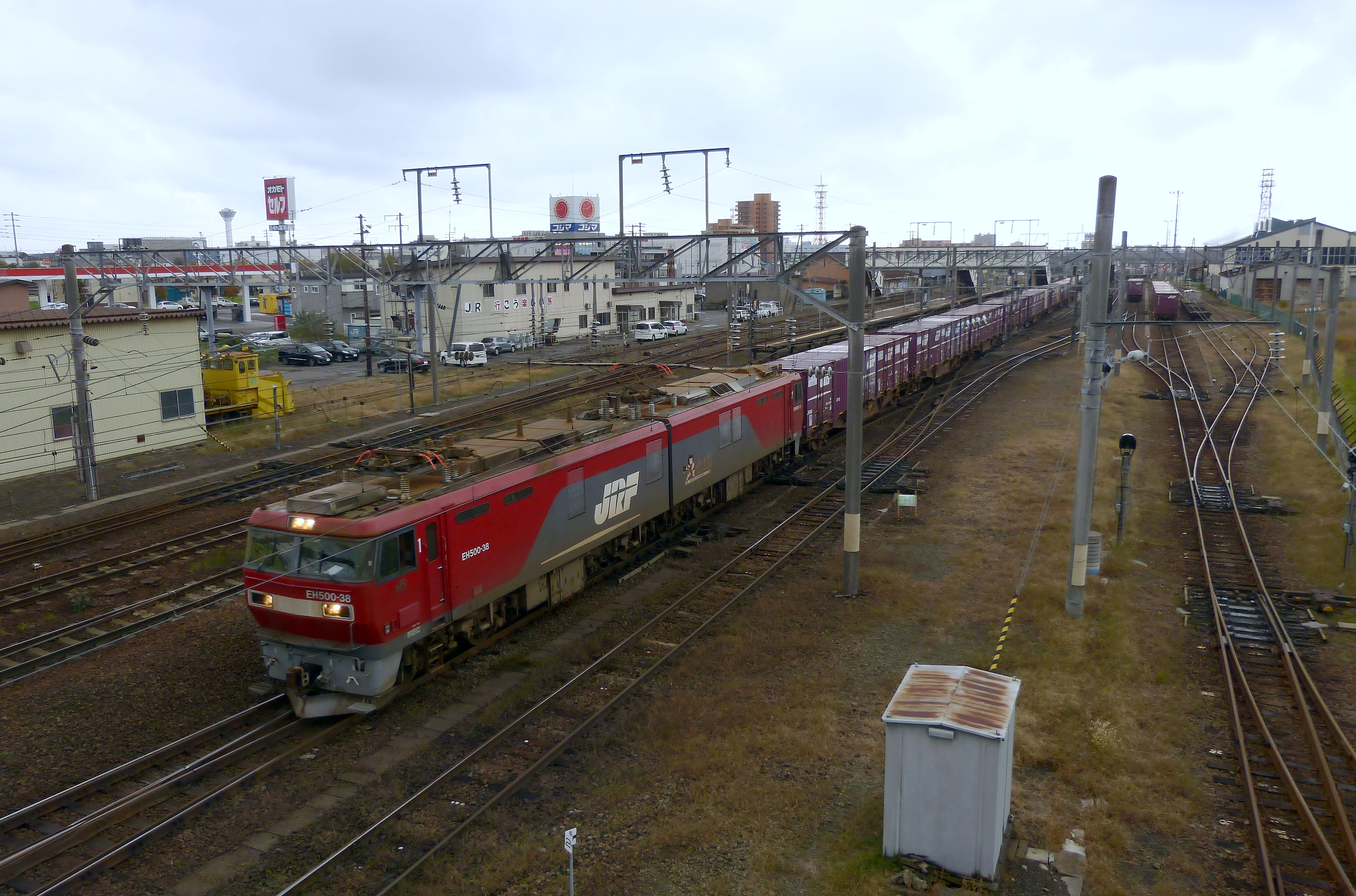
A freight train departing from the station in October 2013

The station has two island platforms serving four tracks.

=== Platforms ===
3-4	■ Hakodate Main Line	for Hakodate
5-6	■ Hakodate Main Line	for Oshamambe and Sapporo
5-6	■ South Hokkaido Railway Line	for Kikonai

== History ==
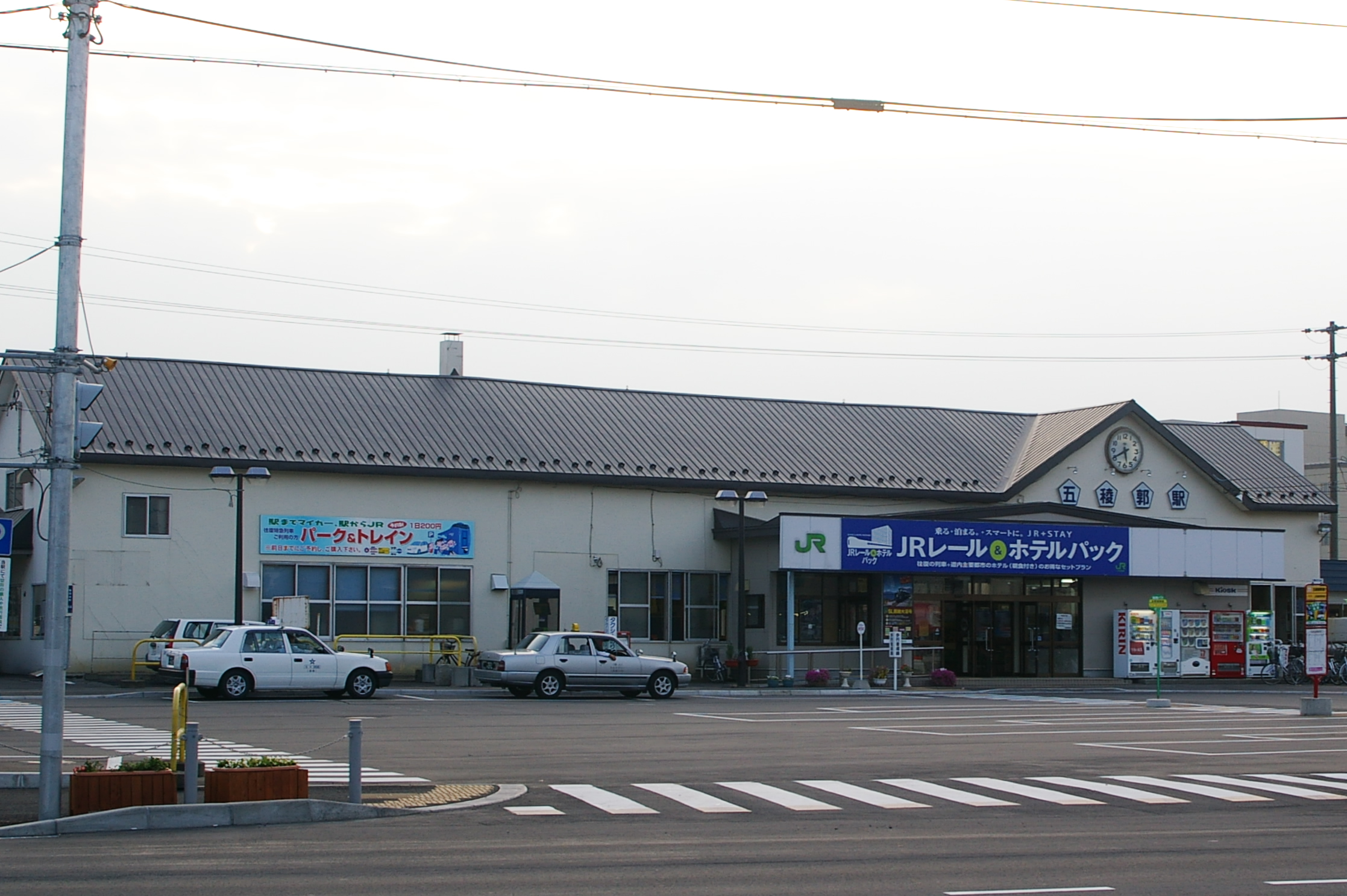
The station building in August 2006

The station opened as a new station on the Hakodate Main Line on September 1, 1911. It became the terminus of the Esashi Line on September 15, 1913. With the privatization of JNR on April 1, 1987, the station came under the control of JR Hokkaido. The freight terminal was renamed Hakodate Freight Terminal on March 12, 2011.

== Surrounding area ==
Hakodate Freight Terminal (函館貨物駅, Hakodate Kamotsu-eki) operated by Japan Freight Railway Company (JR Freight) is located next to the passenger station and was previously called Goryōkaku until it was renamed on March 12, 2011.

- Goryōkaku fort
- Goryōkaku-Ekimae Post office

== See also ==
- List of railway stations in Japan
