= Kikonai Station =

Railway station in Kikonai, Hokkaido, Japan

Kikonai Station 木古内駅
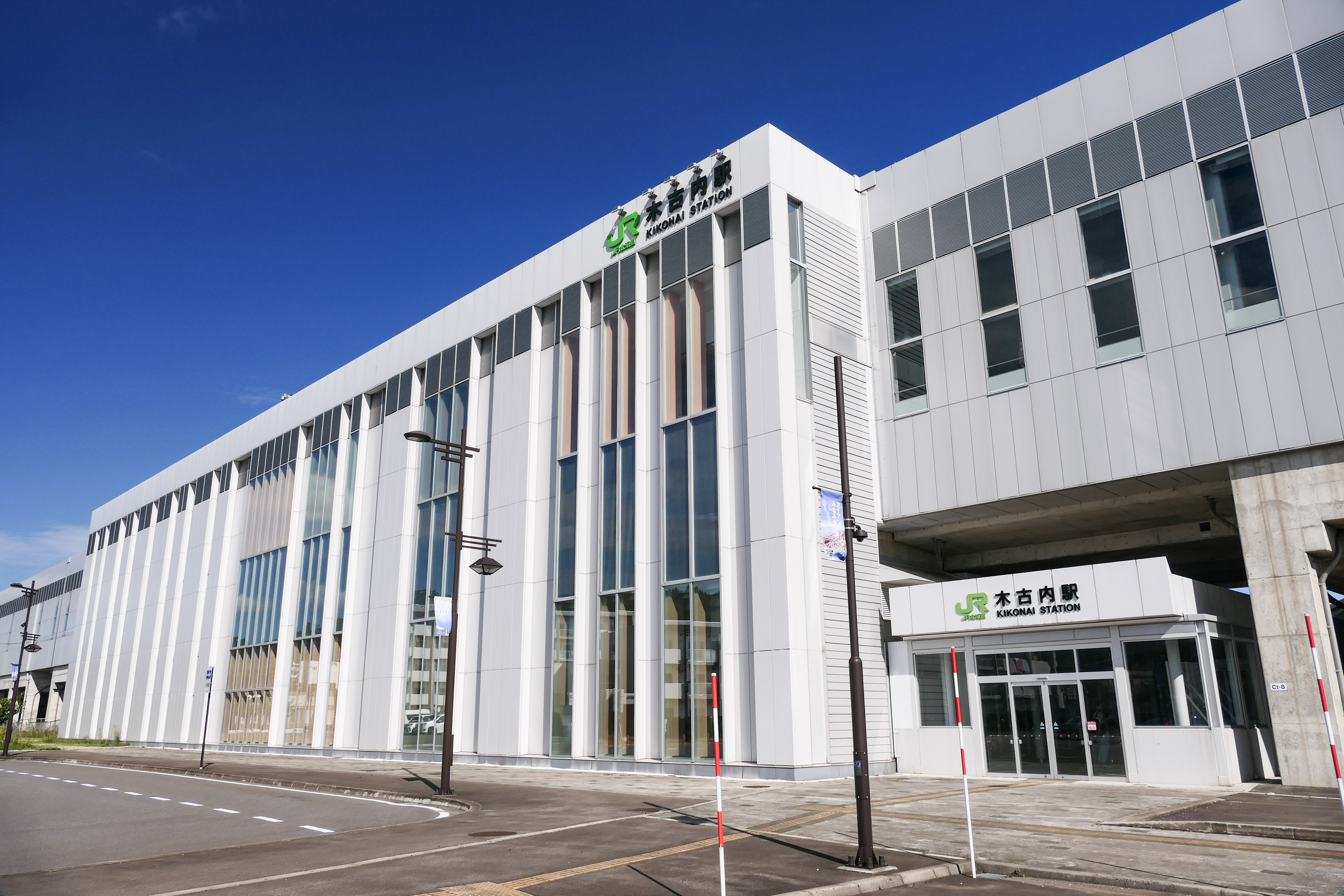
- North entrance, September 2024

General information
- Location: Honchō; Kikonai, Hokkaido; Japan
- Coordinates: 41°40′39″N 140°26′02″E
- Operator: JR Hokkaido; South Hokkaido Railway Company
- Lines: Hokkaido Shinkansen; South Hokkaido Railway Line
- Distance: 788.2 km (489.8 mi) from Tokyo; 37.8 km (23.5 mi) from Goryōkaku
- Platforms: 2 side platforms (Hokkaido Shinkansen); 1 island platform (South Hokkaido Railway)
- Tracks: 4

Other information
- Station code: sh01 (South Hokkaido Railway)

History
- Opened: 25 October 1930; 95 years ago
- Rebuilt: 2016

Services
Preceding station	JR Hokkaido	Following station
Okutsugaru-Imabetsu towards Shin-Aomori	Hokkaido Shinkansen Hayabusa	Shin-Hakodate-Hokuto Terminus
Okutsugaru-Imabetsu towards Shin-Aomori	Hokkaido Shinkansen Hayate	Shin-Hakodate-Hokuto Terminus
Preceding station	South Hokkaido Railway Company	Following station
Terminus	South Hokkaido Railway Line	Satsukari towards Hakodate
Location
- Location within Hokkaido Location within Japan

Kikonai Station (Japanese: 木古内駅, Hepburn: Kikonai-eki) is a railway station in Kikonai, Hokkaido, Japan, operated by Hokkaido Railway Company (JR Hokkaido) and South Hokkaido Railway Company.

== Station layout ==
The station has one ground-level island platform for the South Hokkaido Railway and two elevated side platforms for the Hokkaido Shinkansen.

=== Platforms ===
4-5	■ South Hokkaido Railway	for Goryōkaku and Hakodate
11	■ Hokkaido Shinkansen	for Shin-Aomori and Tokyo
12	■ Hokkaido Shinkansen	for Shin-Hakodate-Hokuto

== History ==
The station opened on the Esashi Line on October 25, 1930. Between October 12, 1937 and March 31, 1988, it was the terminus of the Matsumae Line. It became the terminus of the Kaikyō Line on March 13, 1988. On March 26, 2016, the Hokkaido Shinkansen platforms opened for passenger service.

== Surrounding area ==
- Kikonai post office

== See also ==
- List of railway stations in Japan
