= List of cultural properties of Japan – structures (Hokkaido) =

This list is of the cultural properties of Japan designated in the category of structures (建造物, kenzōbutsu) for the circuit of Hokkaidō.

== National Cultural Properties ==
As of 1 July 2019, thirty Important Cultural Properties with sixty-nine component structures have been designated, being of national significance.

Property	Date	Municipality	Comments	Image	Coordinates	Ref.
Iai Gakuin (Former Iai Girls School) 遺愛学院（旧遺愛女学校） Iai gakuin (kyū-Iai jo-gakkō)	1908	Hakodate	designation comprises two components: the main building and former missionary building		41°47′13″N 140°45′26″E	
Former Asahikawa Officers' Clubhouse 旧旭川偕行社 kyū-Asahikawa kaikōsha	1902	Asahikawa	now the Asahikawa Museum of Sculpture		43°48′20″N 142°21′52″E	
Former Shimoyoichi Unjōya 旧下ヨイチ運上家 kyū-Shimoyoichi unjōya	1853	Yoichi			43°11′52″N 140°47′17″E	
Former Hanada Family Banya 旧花田家番屋（北海道留萌郡小平町） kyū-Hanada-ke banya (Hokkaidō Rumoi-gun Obira-chō)	1905	Obira			44°08′14″N 141°39′19″E	
Former Development Commission Industrial Development Office 旧開拓使工業局庁舎 kyū-Kaitakushi kōgyō-kyoku chōsha	1877	Sapporo	now within the Historical Village of Hokkaido		43°02′51″N 141°29′56″E	
Former Sasanami Family Residence 旧笹浪家住宅（北海道檜山郡上ノ国町） kyū-Sasanami-ke jūtaku (Hokkaidō Hiyama-gun Kaminokuni-chō)	1801-1900	Kaminokuni	designation comprises three components: the main building (C19), earthen warehouse (1885), and rice storehouse and archive (1848)		41°48′12″N 140°06′16″E	
Former Sapporo Agricultural College Drill Hall Clock Tower 旧札幌農学校演武場（時計台） kyū-Sapporo nōgakkō enbujō (tokei-dai)	1878	Sapporo	the bell is one of the 100 Soundscapes of Japan		43°03′45″N 141°21′13″E	
Former Mitobe Family Residence 旧三戸部家住宅（北海道有珠郡伊達町） kyū-Mitobe-ke jūtaku (Hokkaidō Usu-gun Date-chō)	1887 (circa)	Date			42°28′23″N 140°52′30″E	
Former Temiya Railway Facilities 旧手宮鉄道施設 kyū-Temiya tetudō shisetsu	1868-1919	Otaru	designation comprises six components: the No. 1 Locomotive Shed (機関車庫一号) (c. 1908), No. 3 Locomotive Shed (機関車庫三号) (1885), Storehouse for Dangerous Goods (危険品庫) (pre-1898), Water Tower (貯水槽) (pre-1916), Turntable (転車台) (1919), and Retaining Wall (擁壁) (1868-1911)		43°12′43″N 141°00′01″E	
Former Futaba Kindergarten Building 旧双葉幼稚園園舎 kyū-Futaba yōchien ensha	1922	Obihiro			42°55′21″N 143°12′40″E	
Former Nakamura Family Residence 旧中村家住宅（北海道檜山郡江差町） kyū-Nakamura-ke jūtaku (Hokkaidō Hiyama-gun Esashi-chō)	1830-1889	Esashi	designation comprises three components: the Main Building (c. 1889) and two storage buildings (one of c. 1889, the other from the end of the Edo period)		41°52′09″N 140°07′44″E	
Former Nippon Yūsen Otaru Branch Building 旧日本郵船株式会社小樽支店 kyū-Nippon Yūsen kabushiki kaisha Otaru shiten	1905	Otaru			43°12′26″N 140°59′54″E	
Old Public Hall of Hakodate Ward 旧函館区公会堂 kyū-Hakodate-ku kōkaidō)	1910	Hakodate	designation comprises two components: the Main Building and Annex		41°45′54″N 140°42′32″E	
Former Homma Family Residence 旧本間家住宅 kyū-Homma-ke jūtaku	1893-1902	Mashike	designation comprises five components: the Main Building (1902), Store (1893), Annex (c. 1894), Clothing Warehouse (c. 1893), and Brewing Warehouse (c. 1894)		43°51′27″N 141°31′30″E	
Old Abashiri Prison 旧網走監獄 kyū-Abashiri kangoku	1912	Abashiri	designation comprises three components: the Administration Building, Prison House and Central Guard House, and Lecture Hall; now part of the Abashiri Prison Museum (博物館網走監獄)		43°59′44″N 144°13′45″E	
Old Abashiri Prison (Futamigaoka Branch) 旧網走刑務所二見ヶ岡刑務支所（二見ヶ岡農場） kyū-Abashiri keimusho Futamigaoka keimushisho (Futamigaoka nōjō)	1896-1930	Abashiri	designation comprises five components: the Administration Building (1896), Prison House (1896), Lecture Hall and Cafeteria (1926), Building for Chaining and Unchaining (1930), and Kitchen (1896); now part of the Abashiri Prison Museum (博物館網走監獄)		43°59′49″N 144°13′53″E	
Jōkoku-ji Hondō 上國寺本堂; Jōkokuji hondō	1758	Kaminokuni			41°48′12″N 140°06′12″E	
Shōgyō-ji Hondō 正行寺本堂; Shōgyōji hondō	1799	Akkeshi			43°02′09″N 144°50′48″E	
Tachikawa Family Residence Store 太刀川家住宅店舗（北海道函館市弁天町） Tachikawa-ke jūtaku tenpo (Hokkaidō Hakodate-shi Benten-chō)	1900	Hakodate			41°46′17″N 140°42′31″E	
Ōtani-ha Hongan-ji Hakodate Betsu-in 大谷派本願寺函館別院; Ōtani-ha Honganji Hakodate betsuin	1912-25	Hakodate	designation comprises three components: the Hondō (1915), Shōrō (1912–25), and Main Gate (1912–25)		41°45′47″N 140°42′50″E	
Holy Resurrection Cathedral of the Orthodox Church in Hakodate 函館ハリストス正教会復活聖堂; Hakodate Harisutosu seikyōkai fukkatsu seidō	1916	Hakodate	the sound of the church bell is one of the 100 Soundscapes of Japan		41°45′46″N 140°42′44″E	
Hassō-an 八窓庵; Hassōan	Edo period (early)	Sapporo			43°02′47″N 141°21′09″E	
Matsumae Castle Honmaru Gate 福山城（松前城）本丸御門; Fukuyama-jō (Matsumae-jō) honmaru gomon	1853	Matsumae			41°25′47″N 140°06′29″E	
Hōgen-ji Sanmon 法源寺山門; Hōgen-ji sanmon	Edo period (middle)	Matsumae			41°25′53″N 140°06′27″E	
Hōheikan 豊平館; Hōheikan	1880	Sapporo			43°02′47″N 141°21′09″E	
Hokkaido University School of Agriculture (Former Tōhoku Imperial University Agricultural College Farm 2 北海道大学農学部（旧東北帝国大学農科大学）第二農場; Hokkaidō Daigaku nōgakubu (kyū-Tōhoku Teikoku Daigaku Nōka Daigaku) dai ni nōjō	1877-1911	Sapporo	designation comprises nine components		43°03′49″N 141°20′35″E	
Hokkaido University School of Agriculture Botanical Gardens and Museum 北海道大学農学部植物園・博物館; Hokkaidō Daigaku nōgakubu shokubutsu-en・hakubutsukan	1882-1911	Sapporo	designation comprises four components: the Main Building (1882), Offices (1900), Storage Building (1884), and Botanical Garden Gatehouse (1911)		43°03′49″N 141°20′35″E	
Former Hokkaidō Government Office 北海道庁旧本庁舎; Hokkaidō-chō kyū-honchōsha	Edo period (early)	Sapporo			43°03′50″N 141°20′53″E	
Ryūun-in 龍雲院; Ryūun-in	1842	Matsumae	designation comprises five components: the Hondō and Kitchen of 1842, Shōrō of 1846, Sōmon of 1851, and Storehouse, which pre-dates 1846		41°25′53″N 140°06′25″E	
Former Sōma Family Residence 旧相馬家住宅 kyū-Sōma-ke jūtaku	Meiji period (end)	Hakodate	designation comprises two components: the Main Building and Storehouse		41°45′55″N 140°42′39″E	

Completed

== Prefectural Cultural Properties ==
As of 1 May 2019, twenty-five properties with the same number of component structures have been designated at a prefectural level.

Property	Date	Municipality	Comments	Image	Coordinates	Ref.
Nopporo Tondenhei Second Company Headquarters 野幌屯田兵第二中隊本部; Nopporo tondenhei daini chūtai honbu	c.1884	Ebetsu	now the Ebetsu City Tonden Museum (江別市屯田資料館)		43°05′46″N 141°31′13″E	
Kotoni Tondenhei House 琴似屯田兵屋; Kotoni tondenhei oku	1874	Sapporo			43°04′23″N 141°18′05″E	
Former Nagayama Takeshirō Residence 旧永山武四郎邸 kyū-Nagayama Takeshirō tei	c.1877	Sapporo			43°03′57″N 141°21′52″E	
Former Matsumae Castle Honmaru Entrance Hall 旧松前城本丸表御殿玄関 kyū-Matsumae-jō Honmaru omote goten genkan	1900	Matsumae			41°25′46″N 140°06′28″E	
Tokuyama Daijingū 徳山大神宮; Tokuyama Daijingū	Edo period	Matsumae			41°26′05″N 140°06′38″E	
Okuyukiusu Station 奥行臼駅逓; Okuyukiusu ekitei	1910	Betsukai			43°18′47″N 145°12′34″E	
Old Hakodate Museum Building No. 1 旧函館博物館1号 kyū-Hakodate Hakubutsukan ichi-gō	1879	Hakodate			41°45′24″N 140°42′55″E	
Old Hakodate Museum Building No. 2 旧函館博物館2号 kyū-Hakodate Hakubutsukan ni-gō	1884	Hakodate			41°45′22″N 140°42′55″E	
Old Kanamori Shop for Western Goods 旧金森洋物店 kyū-Kanamori yōbutsu-ten	1880	Hakodate	now the Hakodate City Museum of Local Materials (市立函館博物館郷土資料館)		41°45′58″N 140°42′46″E	
Former Hakodate Branch Office of Hokkaidō Government 旧北海道庁函館支庁庁舎 kyū-Hokkaidō-chō Hakodate shichō chōsha	1883	Hakodate			41°45′55″N 140°42′34″E	
Former Hokkaido Development Commission Hakodate Branch Archive 旧開拓使函館支庁書籍庫 kyū-Kaitakushi Hakodate shichō shosekiko	1880	Hakodate			41°45′55″N 140°42′36″E	
Former Hiyama Nishi District Government Office 旧檜山爾志郡役所庁舎 kyū-Hiyama Nishi-gun Yakusho chōsha	1887	Esashi	now the Esashi Town Historical Museum		41°52′05″N 140°07′44″E	
Sunadate Jinja Honden 砂館神社本殿; Sunadate Jinja honden	1779	Kaminokuni			41°48′36″N 140°07′04″E	
Kaminokuni Hachimangū Honden 上ノ國八幡宮本殿; Kaminokuni Hachimangū honden	1699	Kaminokuni	the oldest shrine building in Hokkaidō		41°48′13″N 140°06′14″E	
Honganji Roadside Station Building 本願寺駅逓; Honganji eki-tei	1894	Numata			43°47′14″N 141°54′33″E	
Bibai Tondenhei House 太田屯田兵屋; Bibai tondenhei-ya	1893	Bibai			43°20′05″N 141°51′36″E	
Itsukushima Jinja Honden 厳島神社本殿; Itsukushima Jinja honden	1901	Mashike			43°51′23″N 141°31′27″E	
Former Kona Family Residence 旧小納家住宅 kyū-Kona-ke jūtaku	1900	Haboro			44°26′22″N 141°25′37″E	
Hokkaidō Katei School Chapel 北海道家庭学校礼拝堂; Hokkaidō katei gakkō raihaidō	1919	Engaru			44°04′49″N 143°30′07″E	
Ōta Tondenhei House 太田屯田兵屋; Ōta tondenhei-ya	Meiji period	Akkeshi			43°04′50″N 144°47′00″E	
Wada Tondenhei Village Clothing Warehouse 和田屯田兵の被服庫; Wada tondenhei no hifuku-ko	1885	Nemuro			43°16′15″N 145°32′26″E	

== Municipal Cultural Properties ==
As of 1 May 2019, one hundred and eleven properties with one hundred and eighteen component structures have been designated at a municipal level.

Property	Date	Municipality	Comments	Image	Coordinates	Ref.
Kagetsukan 華月館; Kagetsukan	1897	Takikawa			43°33′54″N 141°55′28″E	for all refs see

== Registered Cultural Properties ==
As of 1 September 2016, one hundred and forty-three properties have been registered (as opposed to designated) at a national level.

Property	Date	Municipality	Comments	Image	Coordinates	Ref.
JR Otaru Station Main Building; JR小樽駅本屋; JR Otaru-eki honya	1934	Otaru			43°11′52″N 140°59′37″E	
Iai Gakuin (Former Iai Girls School) Shaonkan 遺愛学院（旧遺愛女学校）謝恩館; Iai Gakuin (kyū-Iai jo-gakkō) Shaonkan	1922	Hakodate	extended in 1961		41°47′14″N 140°45′28″E	
Iai Gakuin Chapel 遺愛学院講堂; Iai Gakuin kōdō	1935	Hakodate			41°47′15″N 140°45′26″E	
Edwin Dun Memorial Museum エドウィン・ダン記念館（旧北海道庁真駒内種畜場事務所） Edōin Dan Kinenkan (kyū-Hokkaidō-chō Makomanai shuchikujō jimusho)	1887	Sapporo	relocated in 1964		42°59′20″N 141°21′09″E	
Former Japanese National Railways Konpoku Line Koshikawa Viaduct 旧国鉄根北線越川橋梁 kyū-Kokutetsu Konpoku-sen Koshikawa kyōryō	1940	Shari	a ten-arch 147 metres (482 ft) long 21.7 metres (71 ft) high concrete railway bridge, the largest on the island; never complete, two piers were removed during work on Japan National Route 244 in 1973		43°50′12″N 144°47′28″E	

== See also ==
- Cultural Properties of Japan
- National Treasures of Japan
- List of Historic Sites of Japan (Hokkaidō)
- List of Cultural Properties of Japan - paintings (Hokkaidō)
- Hokkaido Museum
- Historical Village of Hokkaido
