= Yunotai Station =

Former railway station in Kaminokuni, Hokkaido, Japan

Coordinates: 41.7503°N 140.2430°E

Yunotai Station 湯ノ岱駅
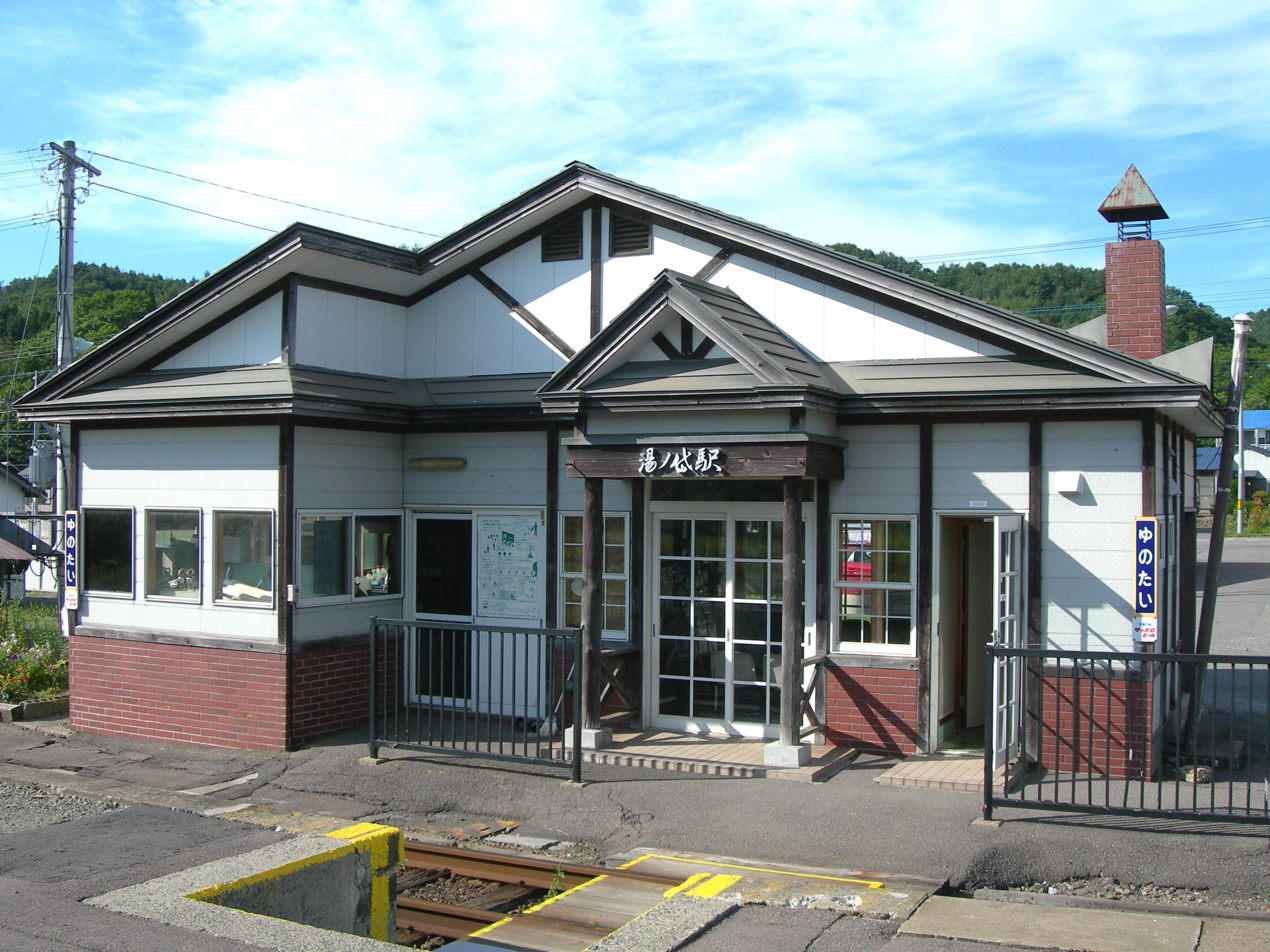
- Yunotai Station

General information
- Location: Yunotai, Kaminokuni, Hiyama District, Hokkaido; Japan
- Operator: JR Hokkaido
- Line: Esashi Line
- Platforms: 1 island platform
- Tracks: 2

History
- Opened: 10 December 1935
- Closed: May 2014
Location
- Location within Hokkaido Location within Japan

Yunotai Station (湯ノ岱駅, Yunotai-eki) was a railway station on the Esashi Line in Kaminokuni, Hokkaido, Japan, operated by Hokkaido Railway Company (JR Hokkaido). It opened in 1935 and closed in May 2014.

== Lines ==
Yunotai Station was served by the non-electrified section of the Esashi Line between Kikonai and Esashi.

== Station layout ==
The station consisted of a single island platform serving two tracks.

=== Platforms ===
1	■ Esashi Line	for Kikonai and Hakodate
2	■ Esashi Line	for Kaminokuni and Esashi

== Adjacent stations ==
«	Service	»
Esashi Line
Shinmei	Local	Miyakoshi

== Surrounding area ==
- Yunotai Post office

== History ==
Yunotai Station opened on 10 December 1935. With the privatization of JNR on 1 April 1987, the station came under the control of JR Hokkaido. The station closed in 2014, with the last services on the line running on 11 May.

== See also ==
- List of railway stations in Japan
