= Naka-Suda Station =

Former railway station in Kaminokuni, Hokkaido, Japan

Coordinates: 41.7872°N 140.1491°E

Naka-Suda Station 中須田駅
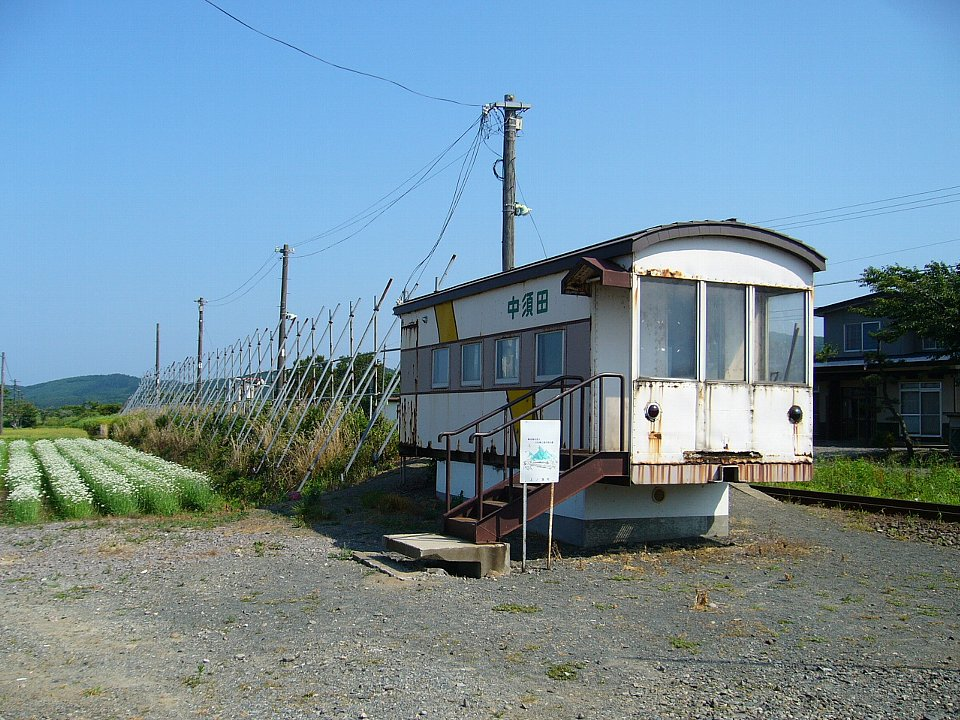

General information
- Location: Kaminokuni, Hiyama District, Hokkaido; Japan
- Operator: JR Hokkaido
- Line: Esashi Line

History
- Opened: 5 March 1955
- Closed: May 2014
Location
- Location within Hokkaido Location within Japan

Naka-Suda Station (中須田駅, Naka-Suda-eki) was a railway station on the Esashi Line in Kaminokuni, Hokkaido, Japan, operated by Hokkaido Railway Company (JR Hokkaido). It opened in 1955 and closed in May 2014.

== Lines ==
Naka-Suda Station was served by the non-electrified section of the Esashi Line between Kikonai and Esashi.

== Station layout ==
The station consisted of a single side platform serving a bidirectional single track.

== Adjacent stations ==
«	Service	»
Esashi Line
Katsuraoka	Local	Kaminokuni

== History ==
Naka-Suda Station opened on 5 March 1955. With the privatization of JNR on 1 April 1987, the station came under the control of JR Hokkaido. The station closed in 2014, with the last services on the line running on 11 May.

== See also ==
- List of railway stations in Japan
