= Esashi =

Esashi may refer to:

== Places in Japan ==
- Esashi District, Hokkaidō, a district in Sōya Subprefecture, Hokkaidō
- Esashi, Hokkaidō (Hiyama), the capital town of Hiyama Subprefecture, Hokkaidō
- Esashi, Hokkaidō (Sōya), a town in Esashi District, Sōya Subprefecture, Hokkaidō
- Esashi, Iwate, previously a city, now a ward in Ōshū city, Iwate Prefecture
  - Esashi District, Iwate, a district located in Iwate Prefecture
- Esashi Station a railway station on the Esashi Line
  - Esashi Line a Japanese railway line
- Esashi Town Historical Museum

== People with the surname ==
- Masayoshi Esashi (江刺 正喜; born 1949), Japanese engineer

== Others ==
- Esashi oiwake music, a folk song from Hokkaidō
