= Consulate General of the United States, Sapporo =

Consulate-General of the United States in Sapporo
- Location: Japan
- Address: Kita 1-jo Nishi 28-chome, Chuo-ku, Sapporo City, Hokkaido 064-0821
- Coordinates: 43°03′23.0″N 141°18′49.8″E
- Consul General: Mark Wuebbels
- Website: jp.usembassy.gov

Consulate-General of the United States in Sapporo is a consulate-general of the United States located in Sapporo, Hokkaido, Japan. It was established on April 28, 1952.

== History ==
Although the U.S. Consulate in Sapporo was established after World War II, the history of U.S. consular offices in Hokkaido dates back to the late Edo period.

=== Prehistory (1854–1865) ===
On March 31, 1854, following the signing of the Treaty of Kanagawa, relations between Japan and the United States were established. This led to the immediate opening of Shimoda, and the opening of Hakodate (now Hakodate) a year later, as well as the permission for Americans to reside in Shimoda and Hakodate. On April 28, 1857, American diplomat Elisha Rice arrived in Hakodate as a trade officer. On August 23, 1857, Rice started his residence in Hakodate with the endorsement of Hotta Masamitsu.

=== U.S. Consulate in Hakodate (1865–1876) ===
On January 18, 1865, Rice, the trade officer, was appointed as the first consul in Hakodate, establishing the U.S. Consulate in Hakodate. Consul Rice held his position until November 2, 1870. Following him, two consuls and two vice-consuls served. The last consul, Merriman Colbert Harris, served from November 6, 1875, to October 5, 1876. In 1876, the U.S. Consulate in Hakodate was closed. The building used as the consulate no longer exists, but a signpost marking the "Former U.S. Consulate Site" stands in Yayoi-cho 4-chome in Hakodate City.

=== U.S. Consular Agency in Hakodate (1876 – 1883/1904 – 1918) ===
In 1876, the U.S. Consular Agency in Hakodate was established in place of the consulate. On January 3, 1877, the former consul, Merriman Harris, took office as the first consular agent and served until February 12, 1879. The agency was temporarily closed in 1883 but reopened in 1904. On May 2, 1904, Edward Julian King became the consular agent and held the position until September 30, 1918. On November 15 of the same year, the U.S. Department of State officially closed the consular agency in Hakodate. Until the end of World War II, there was no U.S. consular presence in all of Hokkaido, including Hakodate.

=== Sapporo Branch, Office of the U.S. Political Adviser (1950–1952) ===
After World War II, the United States established the Sapporo Branch, Office of the U.S. Political Adviser. This office served as the predecessor of the U.S. Consulate in Sapporo and played a significant role in supporting the establishment of the local government system in Hokkaido.

=== U.S. Consulate in Sapporo (1952–1986) ===
On April 28, 1952 (Shōwa 27), with the enforcement of the San Francisco Peace Treaty, Japan regained its independence. Accompanying this, the political adviser's office in Sapporo was closed, and the U.S. Consulate in Sapporo (Consulate of the United States in Sapporo, U.S. Consulate Sapporo) was inaugurated. This was the first establishment of a U.S. consular office in Hokkaido in 34 years and the very first U.S. consulate in Sapporo in history. David Lawrence Osborne was appointed as the inaugural consul, in what was essentially a promotion. In 1955 (Shōwa 30), the consulate relocated to North 1, West 13, Chuo-ku, Sapporo. Then, in 1978 (Shōwa 53), it moved to its current building near Maruyama Park.

=== U.S. Consulate-General in Sapporo (1986–present) ===
On November 21, 1986 (Shōwa 61), the consulate was elevated to become the U.S. Consulate-General in Sapporo.

== Consuls general ==
Since the establishment of the U.S. Consulate in Sapporo in 1952, several consuls general have served. Below is a list of the consuls general:

Name	Date of Appointment	Date of Departure	Notes
Elisha E. Rice	August 23, 1857	January 18, 1865	Trade Officer
Elisha E. Rice	January 18, 1865	November 2, 1870	Consul (Retained)
Ambrose C. Dunn	November 3, 1870	May 15, 1871	Consul
Nathan Emory Rice	May 16, 1871	July 14, 1871	Vice Consul
Elisha E. Rice	July 15, 1871	October 6, 1871	Consul (Reappointed)
George E. Rice	October 7, 1871	March 31, 1872	Vice Consul
John Hart Hawes	April 1, 1872	November 6, 1875	Consul
Merriman Colbert Harris	November 6, 1875	October 5, 1876	Vice Consul
Merriman Colbert Harris	January 3, 1877	February 12, 1879	Acting Consul (Retained)
John H. Duss	February 12, 1879	August 25, 1880	Acting Consul
William C. Davisson	August 25, 1880	September 19, 1882	Acting Consul
Lee W. Squier	September 19, 1882	July 18, 1883	Acting Consul
Vacancy			
Edward Julian King	March 2, 1904	September 30, 1918	Acting Consul
Vacancy			
William L. Magistretti	January 1950	October 1950	Political Advisor
Richard Boswell Finn	October 1950	February 1951	Political Advisor
David Lawrence Osborn	February 1951	April 1952	Political Advisor
David Lawrence Osborn	1952	1953	Consul (Retained)
William Magistretty	1953	1953	Consul
Harry. F. Pfeiffer Jr.	1953	1954	Consul
Daniel Meloy	1954	1956	Consul
Kingdon W. Swayne	1956	1958	Consul
John Knowles	1958	1960	Consul
Ronald A. Gaiduk	1960	1963	Consul
John Sylvester Jr.	1963	1965	Consul
William Clark Jr.	1965	1967	Consul
William Tully Breer	1967	1968	Consul
Martin G. Heflin	1968	1971	Consul
Sunao Sakamoto	1971	1973	Consul
Stephen Martin Ecton	1973	1975	Consul
Lawrence F. Farrar	1975	1977	Consul
Donald B. Westmore	1977	1979	Consul
Christopher J. LaFleur	1979	1980	Consul
Charles F. Kartman	1980	1982	Consul
Robert C. Reis Jr.	1982	1984	Consul
Mark C. Minton	1984	1986	Consul
John R. Dinger	1986	November 1986	Consul
John R. Dinger	November 1986	1989	Chief Consul (Retained)
Roger L. Dankert	1989	1992	Chief Consul
Dennis J. Ortblad	1992	1995	Chief Consul
Richard M. Gibson	1995	1996	Chief Consul
Marlene J. Sakaue	1997	1998	Chief Consul
W. Michael Meserve	1998	2001	Chief Consul
Alec P. Wilczynski	2001	2004	Chief Consul
Marrie Y. Schaefer	2004	2007	Chief Consul
Donna Ann Welton	2007	2010	Chief Consul
John Ries	August 2010	June 2013	Chief Consul
JoEllen Gorg	September 2014	August 2016	Principal Consul
Rachel Brunette-Chen	August 2016	July 2019	Principal Consul
Andrew Lee	August 2019	August 2022	Chief Consul
Mark Wuebbels	August 2022	July 2025	Principal Consul
Yuki Kondo-Shah	August 2025	present	Principal Officer
