= Kaminokuni Station =

Former railway station in Kaminokuni, Hokkaido, Japan

Coordinates: 41.8054°N 140.1243°E

Kaminokuni Station 上ノ国駅
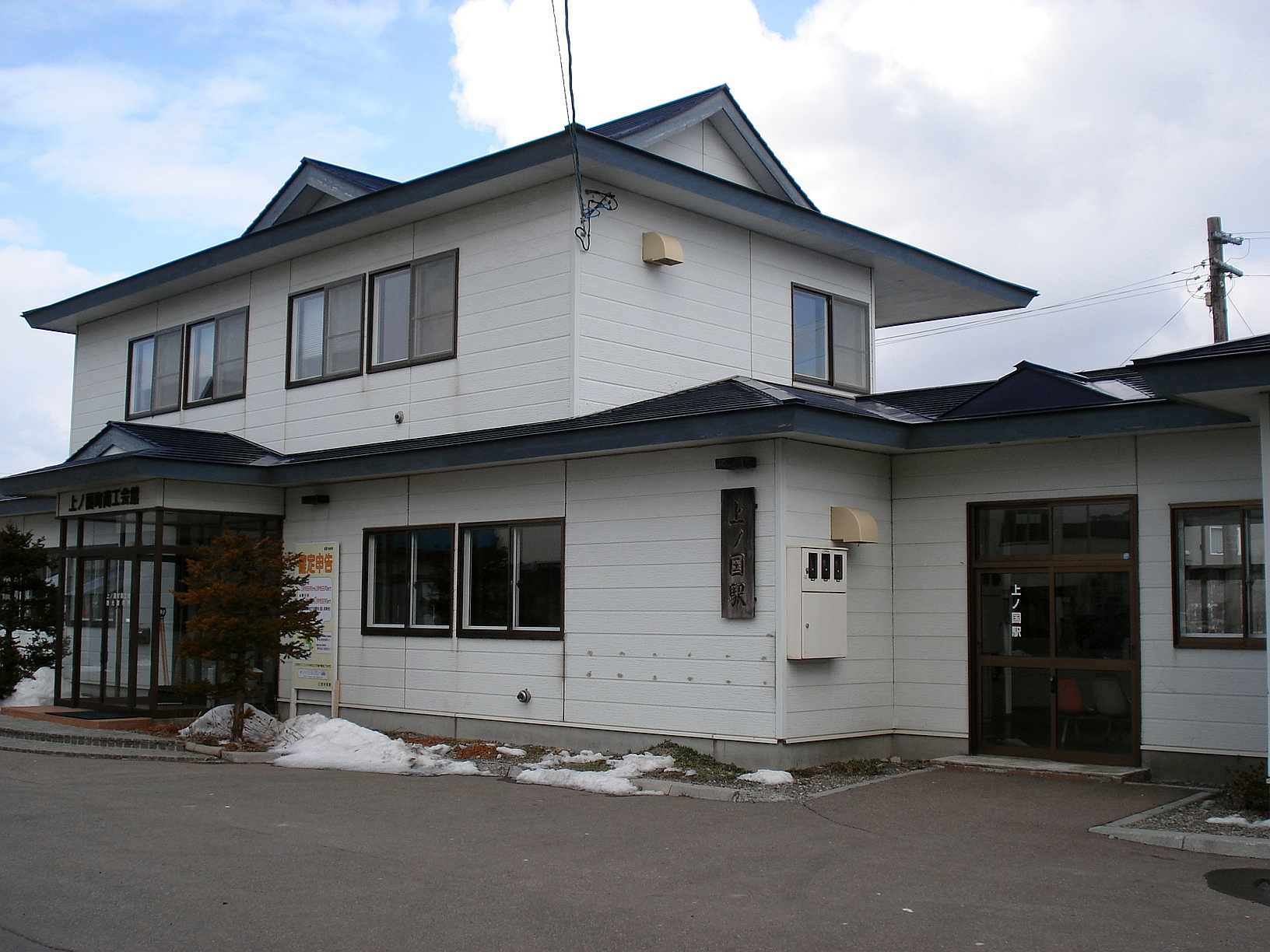
- Kaminokuni Station in February 2009

General information
- Location: Kaminokuni, Hiyama District, Hokkaido; Japan
- Operator: JR Hokkaido
- Line: Esashi Line
- Platforms: 1 side platform
- Tracks: 1

History
- Opened: 10 November 1936
- Closed: May 2014
Location
- Location within Hokkaido Location within Japan

Kaminokuni Station (上ノ国駅, Kaminokuni-eki) was a railway station on the Esashi Line in Kaminokuni, Hokkaido, Japan, operated by Hokkaido Railway Company (JR Hokkaido). It opened in 1936 and closed in May 2014.

== Lines ==
Kaminokuni Station was served by the non-electrified section of the Esashi Line between Kikonai and Esashi.

== Station layout ==
The station consisted of a single side platform serving a bidirectional single track.

== Adjacent stations ==
«	Service	»
Esashi Line
Naka-Suda	Local	Esashi

== History ==
Kaminokuni Station opened on 10 November 1936. With the privatization of JNR on 1 April 1987, the station came under the control of JR Hokkaido. The station closed in 2014, with the last services on the line running on 11 May.

== See also ==
- List of railway stations in Japan
