= Kikonai Town Museum =

Kikonai Town Museum "Ikarinkan"
- 木古内町郷土資料館「いかりん館」
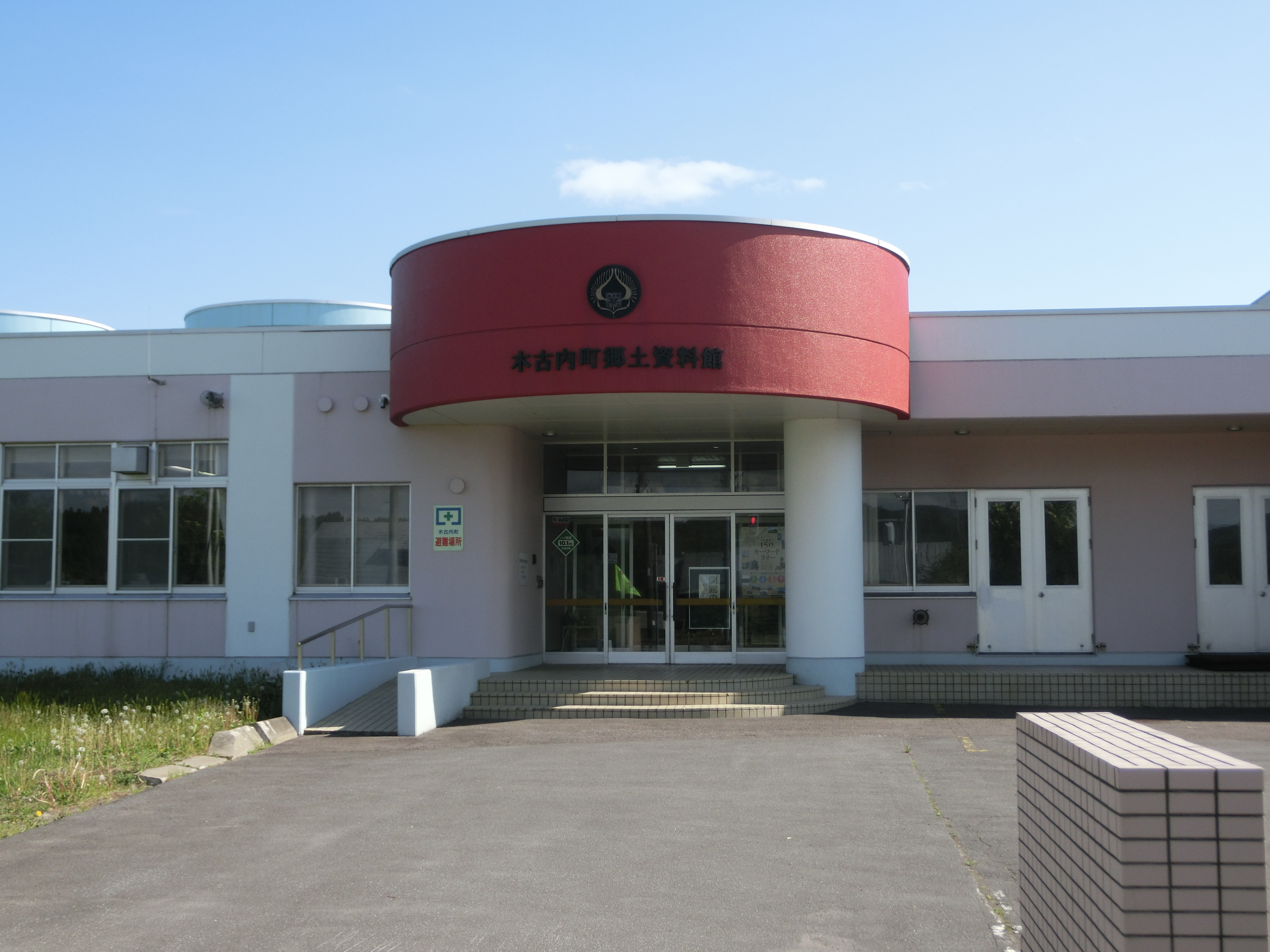

- Location within Hokkaido Location within Japan

General information
- Location: Tsuruoka 74-1, Kikonai, Hokkaidō, Japan
- Coordinates: 41°40′17″N 140°24′46″E
- Opened: March 2015

Website
- Official website

The Kikonai Town Museum or "Ikarinkan" (木古内町郷土資料館「いかりん館」, Kikonai-chō kyōdo shiryōkan Ikarinkan) opened in Kikonai, Hokkaidō, Japan in 2015. The museum is housed in the former Tsuruoka Elementary School, which closed in March 2011. When first opened, the museum exhibited some six hundred objects previously stored by the Kikonai Town Board of Education or donated by members of the public.

The display is divided into four main zones, each with its own room: "Kikonai Long, Long Ago", with artefacts from the sixty-one archaeological sites identified in Kikonai to-date; "History and Development of the Town"; "Industries of Kikonai", with a main focus on farming, forestry, and fishing; and "People's Way of Life and Culture". A fifth room relating to the railways opened in March 2016, on the anniversary of the opening of the museum and to celebrate the connection of Kikonai Station to the Hokkaido Shinkansen; it has some fifteen hundred items relating to the former Matsumae Line (松前線), the Esashi Line, the days of JNR and JR, and the Seikan ferry that connects Aomori with Hakodate. The museum also displays an ikari or anchor, which was found some 2 kilometres (1.2 mi) off Cape Saraki (サラキ岬) at a depth of 20 metres (66 ft), and purported to be from the warship Kanrin Maru.

== See also ==
- Matsumae Town Historical Museum
- Esashi Town Historical Museum
- Seikan Tunnel
