= Mount Daisengen =

Mountain in Japan

- 大千軒岳
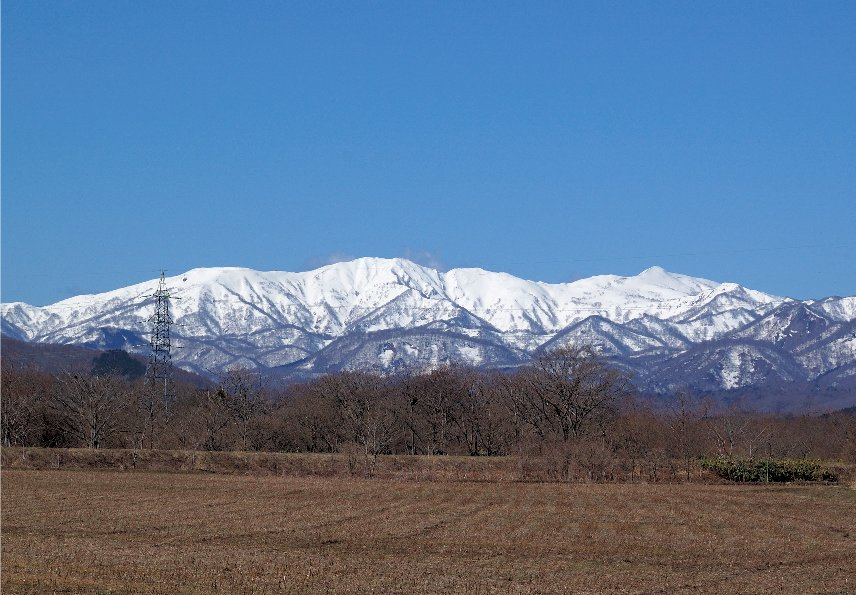
- View of Maesengen (left) and Daisengen (right) from Shiriuchi

Highest point
- Elevation: 1,072 m (3,517 ft)
- Listing: Mountains and hills of Japan
- Coordinates: 41°34′45.55″N 140°9′38.95″E

Naming
- Language of name: Japanese

Geography
- Location within Hokkaido
- Location: Hokkaidō, Japan

Climbing
- Easiest route: New Road route

Mount Daisengen (大千軒岳, Daisengen-dake) is a 1,072-metre (3,517 ft) mountain located on the Oshima Peninsula of Hokkaidō, Japan. Mount Daisengen is the tallest mountain in the southern region of the peninsula.

A gold mine was established on the mountain during the Edo period, and a group of 106 Japanese Christians were executed on the mountain by the Matsumae clan during the nationwide crackdown on Christianity.

Several climbing routes exist.

== History ==
By about 1612, some Japanese Christians began to flee to the less populated Tōhoku and Ezo (modern-day Hokkaido) regions of Japan in order to escape religious persecution by the Tokugawa shogunate. Some of these Japanese Christians took up residence working at the gold mine near Mount Daisengen.

The aftermath of the 1637 to 1638 Shimabara Rebellion led to a more severe government crackdown on Christianity within Japan, and in 1639, the Matsumae clan executed 106 Japanese Christians who worked on the mountain mining gold.

== Adventuring ==
=== Climbing routes ===
==== New Road route (新道コース) ====
Trailhead is accessed from Matsumae. Round trip of roughly 3 hours and 50 minutes. The route is suitable for beginners.

==== Old Road route (旧道コース) ====
Trailhead is accessed from Matsumae. Round trip of roughly 3 hours and 50 minutes.

==== Kaminokuni Ishisaki route ====
A trail from Kaminokuni exists but is currently inaccessible due to the road to the trailhead being closed.

==== Sengen route (千軒コース) ====
Trailhead is accessed from Fukushima. Round trip of roughly 7 hours and 30 minutes. The remains of a gold mine guard house exist adjacent to the Sengen route. A stone monument with a large cross at the top was constructed in remembrance of the martyrdom of the 106 Japanese Christians.

== Gallery ==
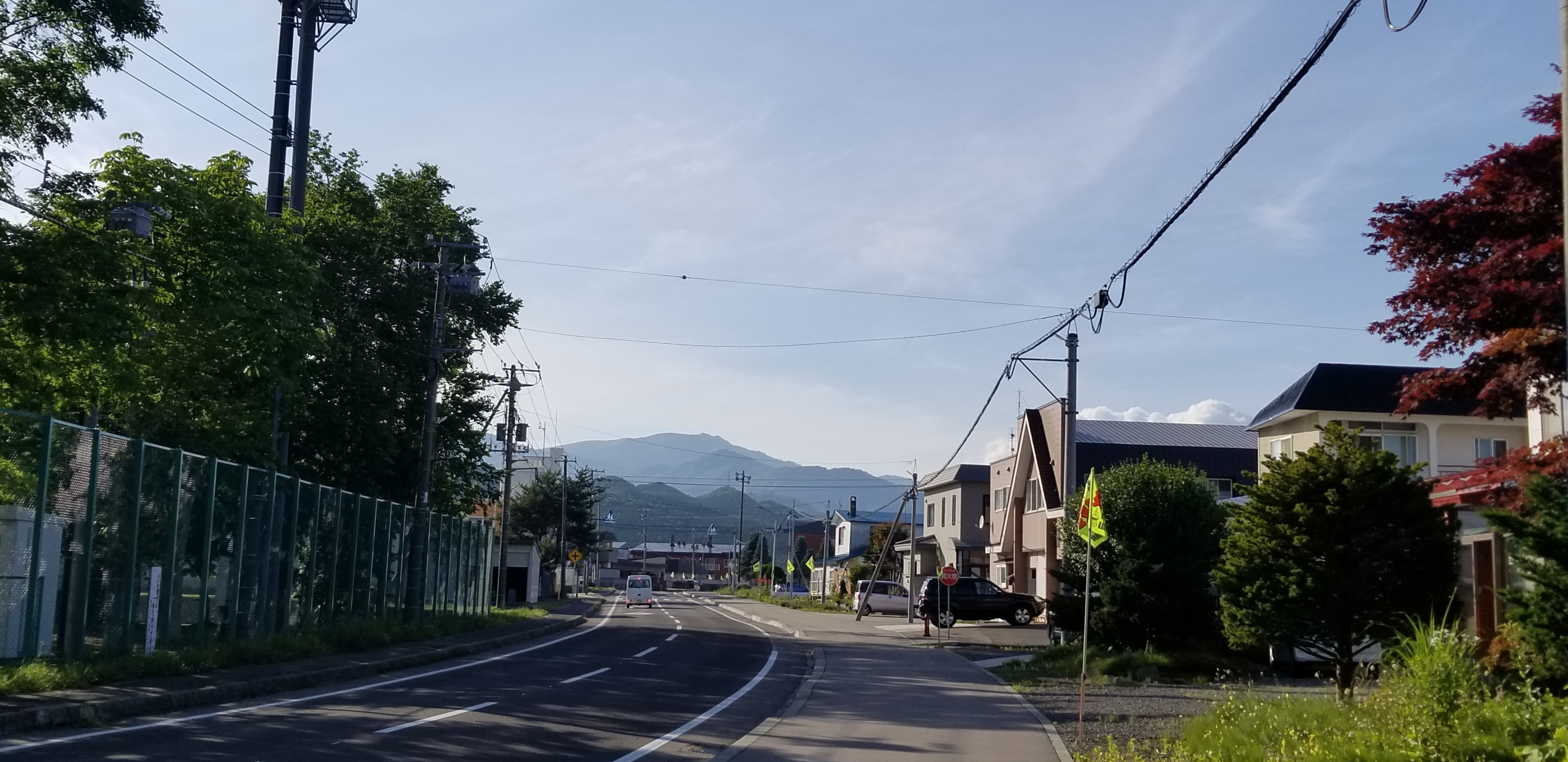
View of Mount Daisengen from Fukushima, Hokkaido.

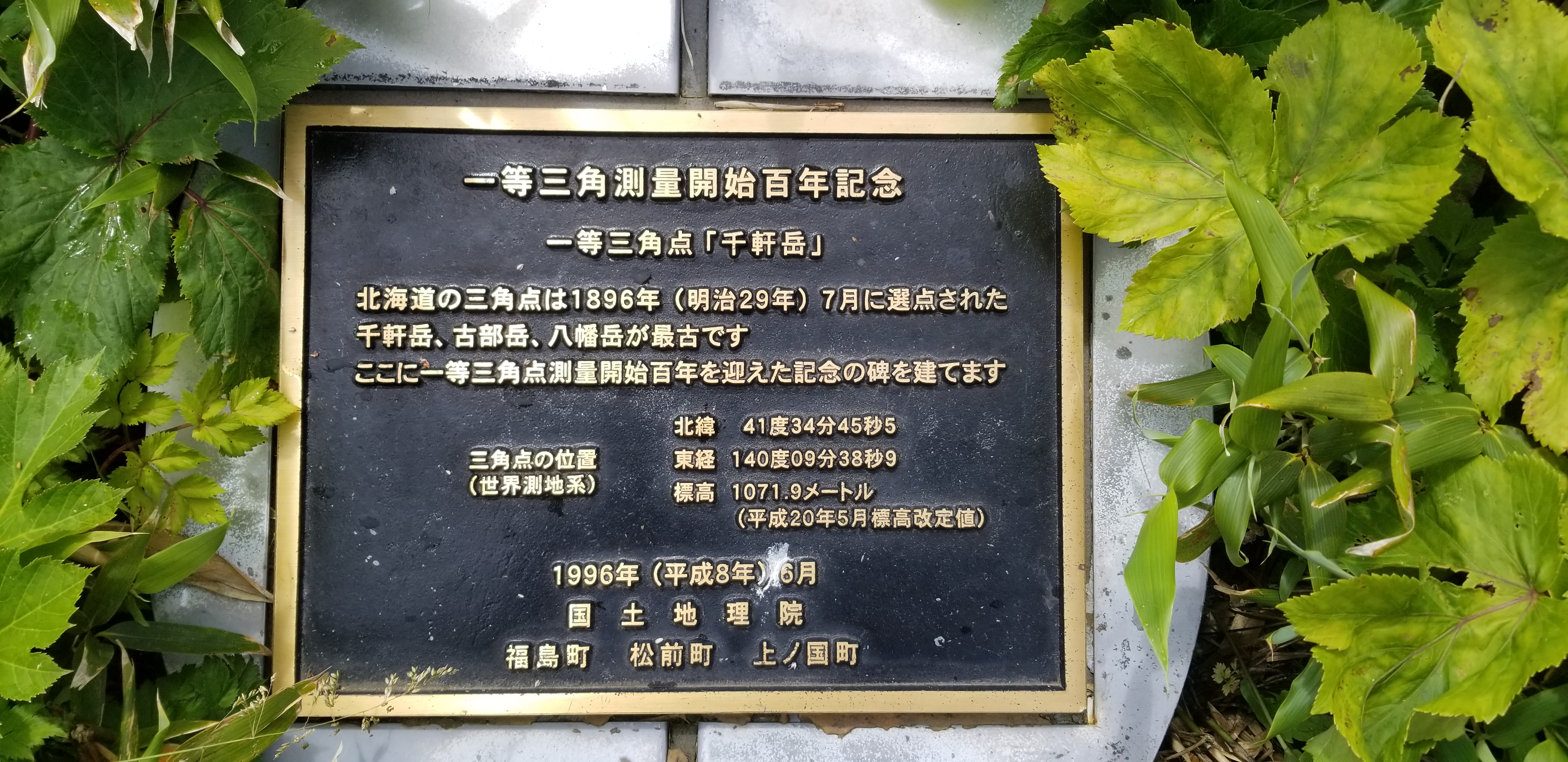
Commemorative plaque at the summit of Mount Daisengen. This plaque marks the 100 year anniversary of the commencement of creating a triangulation station in the area.
