= 12th Ohio Cavalry Regiment =

- Active: November 24, 1863, to November 14, 1865
- Country: United States
- Allegiance: Union
- Branch: Cavalry
- Equipment: Spencer repeating carbines
- Engagements: Battle of Mount Sterling; Battle of Cynthiana; Battle of Saltville; Second Battle of Saltville

The 12th Ohio Cavalry Regiment was a cavalry regiment that served in the Union Army during the American Civil War.

== Service ==
The 12th Ohio Cavalry Regiment was organized at Camp Taylor in Cleveland, Ohio, and mustered in November 24, 1863, for a three years under the command of Colonel Robert Wilson Ratliff.

The regiment was attached to 2nd Brigade, 5th Division, XXIII Corps, District of Kentucky, Department of the Ohio, to July 1864. 4th Brigade, 1st Division, District of Kentucky, Department of the Ohio, to February 1865. 1st Brigade, Cavalry Division, District of East Tennessee, Department of the Cumberland, to July 1865. Cavalry Brigade, District East Tennessee, to November 1865.

The 12th Ohio Cavalry mustered out of service November 14, 1865, at Nashville, Tennessee.

== Detailed service ==
Duty at Camp Chase, Ohio, until February 1864, Johnson's Island (Company C as Guards) and at Camp Dennison until March. Ordered to Nashville, Tenn., March 31, 1862. Operations against Morgan's invasion of Kentucky May 31-June 20, 1864. Action at Mt. Sterling, Ky., June 9. Cynthiana June 12. Skirmish at Lebanon, Ky., July 30 (1 company). Burbridge's Expedition into southwestern Virginia September 20-October 17. McCormack's Farm September 23. Laurel Mountain September 29. Action at Saltville, Va., October 2. Stoneman's Raid from Bean's Station, Tenn., into southwestern Virginia, December 10–29. Bristol December 14. Marion December 17–18. Saltville December 20–21. Stoneman's Raid into southwestern Virginia and western North Carolina March 21-April 25, 1865. Wilkesborough March 29. Wilkinsville N.C., April 8. Danbury April 9. Statesville and Salem April 11. Salisbury April 12. Dallas and Catawba River April 17. Swannanoah Gap April 20. Howard's Gap, Blue Ridge Mountains, April 22. Asheville April 25. Duty in middle Tennessee, eastern Tennessee, and North Carolina, until November 1865.

== Casualties ==
The regiment lost a total of 164 men during service; 50 enlisted men were killed or mortally wounded and 112 enlisted men died of disease.

== Commanders ==
- Colonel Robert Wilson Ratliff

== Notable members ==
- Corporal Merriman Colbert Harris, Company H - Missionary Bishop of the Methodist Episcopal Church, elected in 1904.
- Bugler William Allen Magee, Company M - Third-last verified surviving Union veteran of the Civil War. He died January 23, 1953, in Long Beach, California, at age 106. He is listed as enlisting as a bugler on October 20, 1863, at age 18 (a 2-year age exaggeration).

== See also ==
- List of Ohio Civil War units
- Ohio in the Civil War
