= Kojima (Hokkaido) =

Island in Hokkaido, Japan

Ko
Native name: 小島, Ko-jima
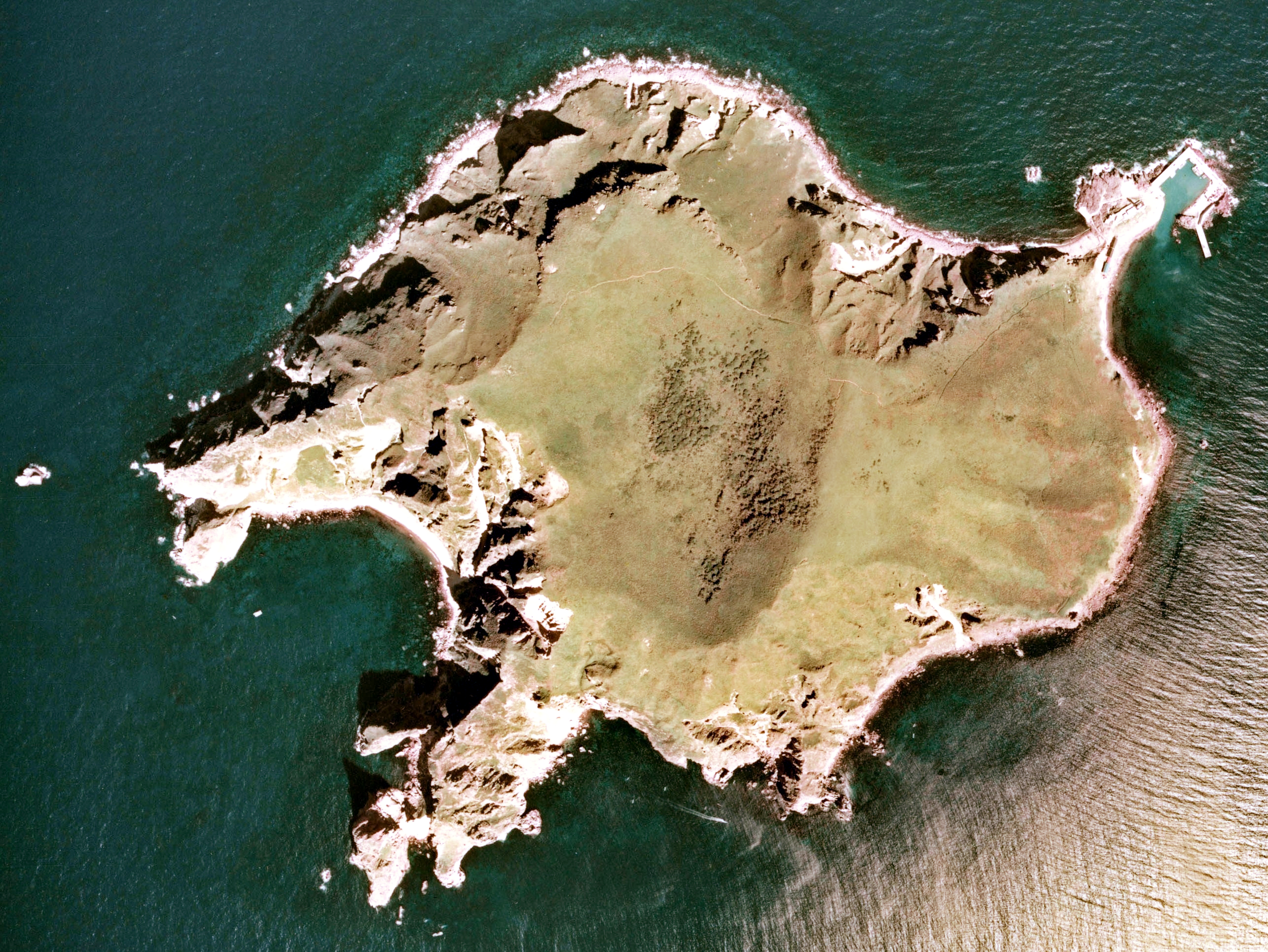
- Interactive map of Ko

Geography
- Location: East Asia
- Coordinates: 41°21′34″N 139°48′18″E
- Archipelago: Japanese archipelago
- Area: 1.54 km^{2} (0.59 sq mi)
- Coastline: 5 km (3.1 mi)
- Highest elevation: 282.1 m (925.5 ft)
- Highest point: Ko Island

Administration
- Japan
- Prefecture: Hokkaido
- Subprefecture: Oshima Subprefecture
- District: Matsumae District
- Town: Matsumae

Demographics
- Population: uninhabited

Ko Island (小島, Ko-jima) or Kojima is an uninhabited volcanic island in the Sea of Japan, 23 kilometres (14 mi) southwest of the mainland portion of the town of Matsumae and is the southernmost point in Hokkaidō. It is under the administration of the district of Matsumae in Oshima Subprefecture in Hokkaido, Japan. To distinguish Ko Island from other islands with the same name, it is sometimes known as Oshima Ko Island (渡島小島, Oshima-Kojima) or Matsumae Ko Island (松前小島, Matsumae-Kojima).

Ko Island is the world's smallest volcanic island. It has an area of 1.54 square kilometres (0.59 sq mi). The island is an andesitic stratovolcano. The peak consists of non-alkali mafic rocks, dating from the Early Pleistocene overtop of non-alkali felsic rocks from the Late Miocene-Pliocene.

Several smaller islets surround Ko Island, including Daihiyakushima, Shohiyakushima, Tenjinshima, and Sazaeshima.

To provide refuge for fishing vessels, a small harbor has been put in place.

== Flora and fauna ==
Ko Island has been designated a natural monument. It is a breeding ground for common guillemot, Japanese cormorant, and black-tailed gull. The island, along with some neighbouring islets, have been recognised as an Important Bird Area (IBA) by BirdLife International because they also support colonies of rhinoceros auklets.

15 kilometres (9.3 mi) to the west of Ko Island is the Ko Island Bank, where migratory fish tend to gather. In the adjacent seas there is also tuna and squid. In previous times it was referred to as the Sea of Treasure (宝の海, Takara no Umi). For this reason it is a major fishing area for fishermen out of Matsumae, especially because of the decline in the Arabesque greenling over the last 24 to 25 years.

The predominant vegetation on the island is grasses, but there are stands of Acer pictum subsp. mono in the caldera.

== See also ==
- Desert island
- Lists of islands

== Sources ==
- Based on the translation of ja:渡島小島 on 14 December 2008
- "Oshima-Kojima". Global Volcanism Program. Smithsonian Institution.
