= Oshima (Hokkaido) =

Volcanic island in the Sea of Japan, near Hokkaido

Ōshima
Native name: 大島, Ōshima
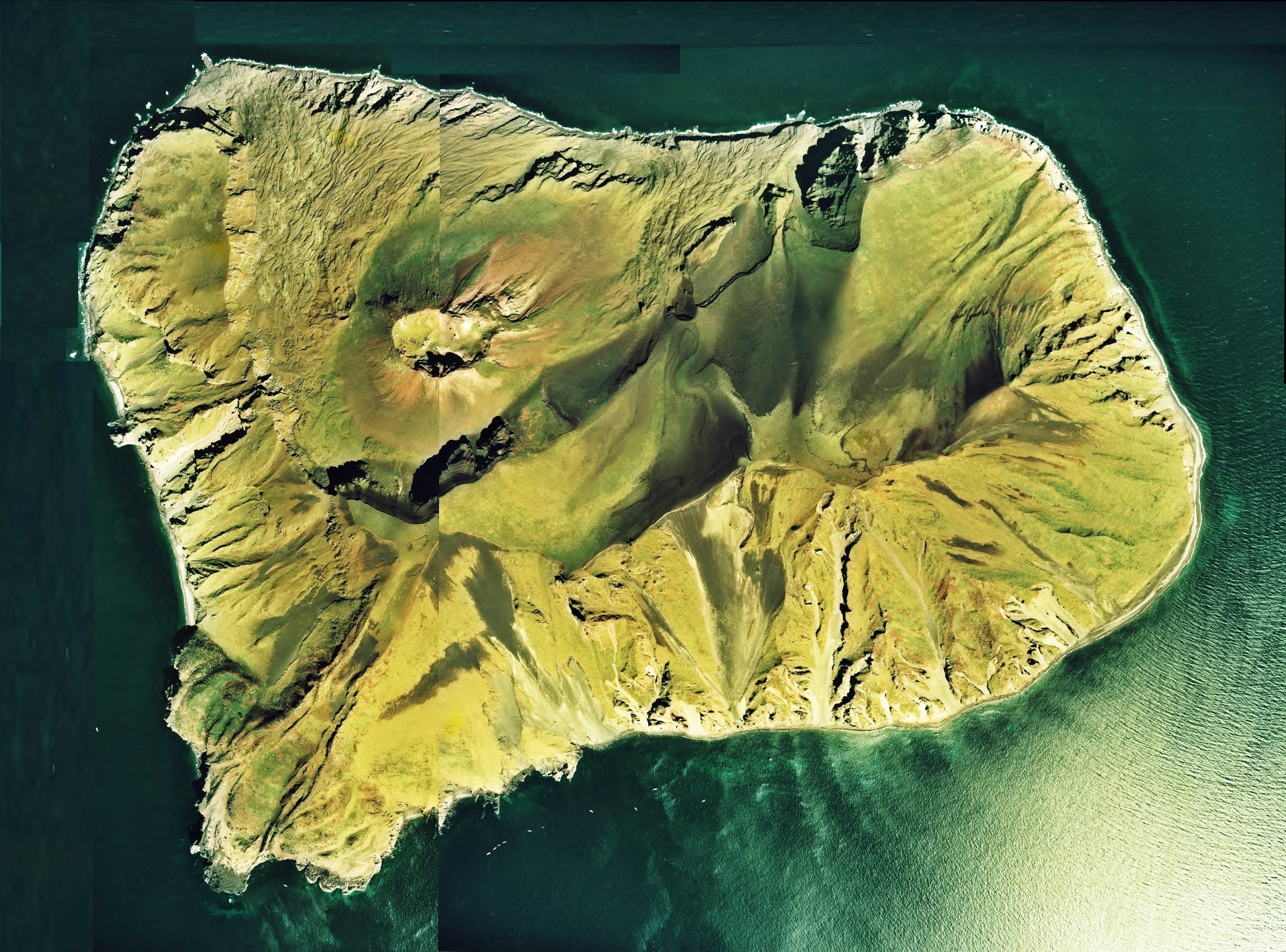
- Interactive map of Ōshima

Geography
- Location: East Asia
- Coordinates: 41°30′N 139°23′E
- Archipelago: Japanese archipelago
- Area: 9.73 km^{2} (3.76 sq mi)
- Width: 4 km (2.5 mi)
- Highest elevation: 732.4 m (2402.9 ft)
- Highest point: Mount Era

Administration
- Japan
- Prefecture: Hokkaido
- Subprefecture: Oshima Subprefecture
- District: Matsumae District
- Town: Matsumae

Ōshima (大島; lit. Big Island) is an uninhabited island in the Sea of Japan, 50 kilometers (31 mi) west of Matsumae town and therefore the westernmost point of Hokkaido. It is part of the town of Matsumae in Oshima Subprefecture in Hokkaido, Japan. To distinguish Ōshima from other islands with the same name, it is sometimes known as Oshima Ōshima (渡島大島) or Matsumae Ōshima (松前大島).

At 9.73 square kilometers (3.76 sq mi), Ōshima is the largest uninhabited island under Japanese sovereignty. The island is a double caldera with a scoria hill rising in the middle. It is the peak of two overlapping stratovolcanoes and their associated calderas, Mount Higashi and Mount Nishi. The highest peak, Mount Era (江良岳, Era-dake) at 737 meters (2,418 ft), is part of a triple volcano. The peak rises close to 2,000 meters (6,600 ft) from the sea floor. The island consists of mafic alkali and non-alkali volcanic rock, less than 18,000 years old. On the south side of the island at Aidomari (北風泊, Aidomari), there is a lighthouse and a heliport operated by Japan's Coast Guard.

Because of volcanic activity and nature conservation, landing on the island requires the approval of the Agency for Cultural Affairs.

== History ==
Because of the island's isolation and volcanic activity, there are almost no records of its past left behind. Mount Kanpo (寛保岳, Kanpo-dake) had a major eruption on 27 August 1741, which created a large horseshoe-shaped caldera breached to the north and extending from the summit down to the seafloor at the base of the volcano. This event produced a mostly-submarine debris avalanche that traveled 16 km and triggered a large tsunami, which devastated the coasts of Hokkaido, western Honshu, and Korea, causing nearly 1500 deaths. The 1741 eruption was the largest in historical times at Ōshima and ended with the construction of a basaltic cinder cone at the head of the breached caldera. No eruptions have occurred since the last eruption in 1790, but seismic unrest under the volcano occurred in 1996.

== Flora and fauna ==
Ōshima is the northern limit of the breeding grounds for the streaked shearwater and is part of the Matsumae-Yakoshi Prefectural Natural Park. Baird's beaked whales are targets of commercial whaling in the nearby waters.

== See also ==
- Desert island
- List of islands
- List of volcanoes in Japan

== Sources ==
- Based on the translation of ja:渡島大島 on 12 December 2008
