= Matsumae District, Hokkaido =

District in Hokkaido, Japan

Coordinates: 41.521°N 140.15°E

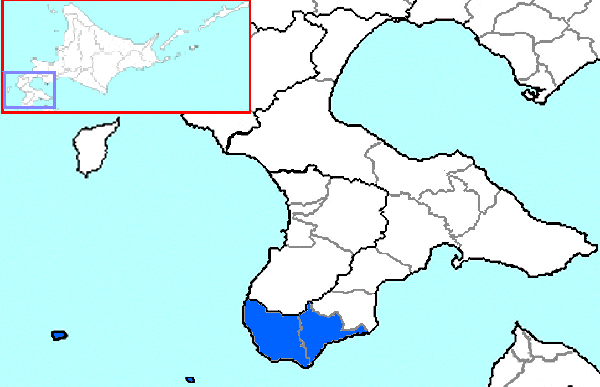
The area of Matsumae District in Oshima Subprefecture.

Matsumae (松前郡, Matsumae-gun) is a district located in southwestern Oshima Subprefecture, Hokkaido, Japan.

As of 2004, the district has an estimated population of 16,068 and a density of 33.45 persons per km^{2}. The total area is 480.32 km^{2}.

== Towns ==
- Fukushima
- Matsumae

== History ==
- 1869: With the establishment of provinces and Districts in Hokkaido, Tsugaru District (identical to modern Matsumae Town) and Fukushima District (identical to modern Fukushima Town and Shiriuchi in Kamiiso District) were set up.
- 1871–1872: Placed under Hirosaki Prefecture and Aomori Prefecture.
- 1881: Shiriuchi Village and Shōkokuishi (?) Village (小谷石村) (split off from Fukushima Village) transferred to Kamiiso District. The remaining area of Fukushima District and Tsugaru District were merged to form Matsumae District.
- 1897: Matsumae Subprefecture established containing only Matsumae District.
- 1903: Matsumae Subprefecture merged with Hakodate Subprefecture (later renamed Oshima Subprefecture).

== Geography ==
The district is located on the southern end of the Matsumae Peninsula. The district includes the two islands in the Tsugaru Strait, Oshima and Kojima.
