= Katsuyama Date =

Castle in Hokkaido, Japan

- 勝山館
- Hiyama, Hokkaido, Japan
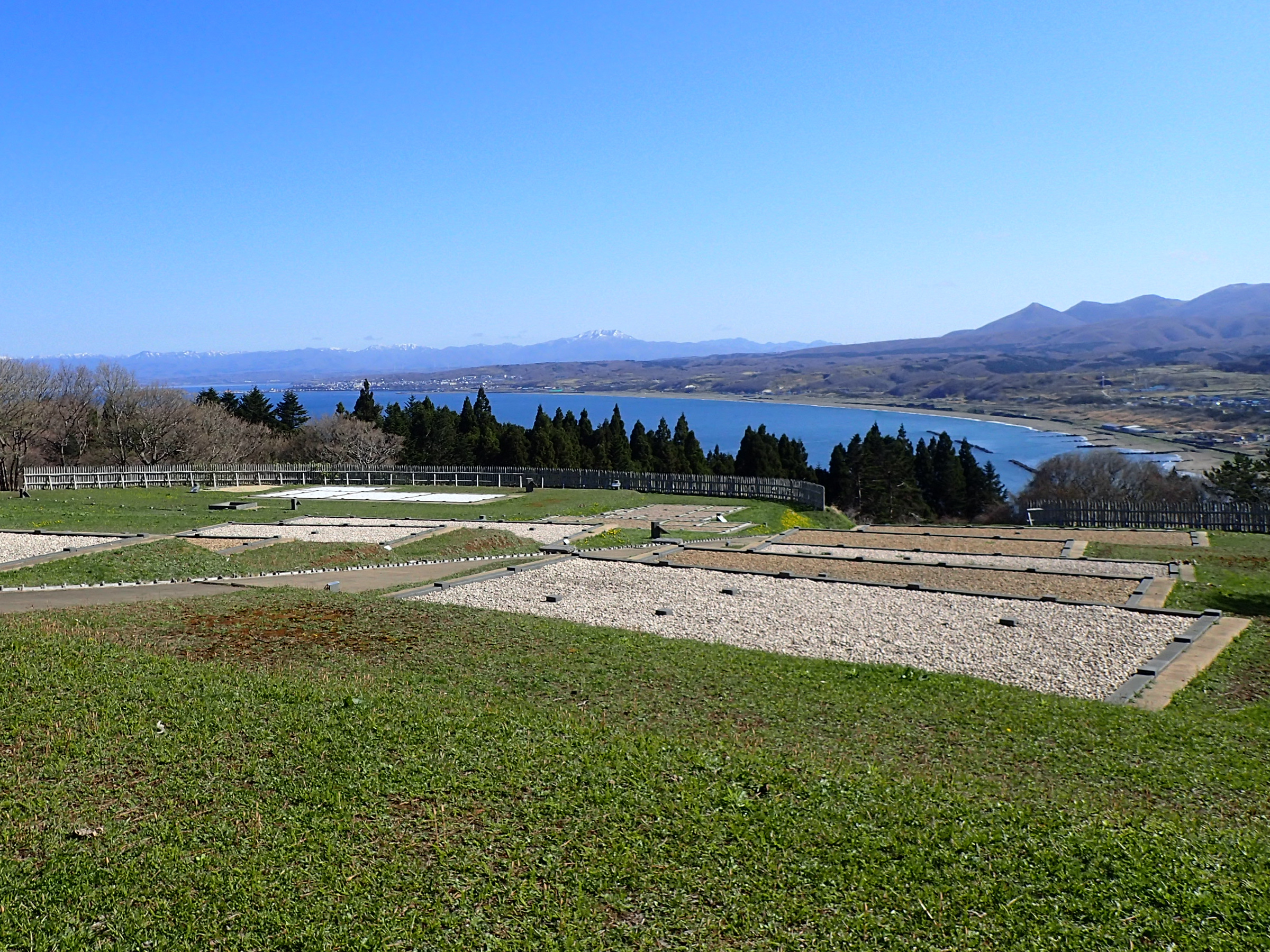
- Katsuyama Date

Site information
- Type: Yamajiro-style castle
- Owner: Kakizaki clan
- Condition: ruins

Location
- Coordinates: 41.8015°N 140.1007°E

Site history
- Built: 15c
- Built by: Takeda Nobuhiro
- Demolished: Unknown

Garrison information
- Past commanders: Takeda Nobuhiro, Kakizaki Mitsuhiro

Katsuyama Date (勝山館, Katsuyama-Date) is the remains of a castle or fortified residence in Hiyama, Hokkaido, Japan. It is believed the castle was built by Takeda Nobuhiro in the 15th century.

The castle is now only ruins, just some remnants of moats and earthen walls. Its ruins have been protected as a National Historic Site, since 1977. Katsuyama Date was listed as one of the Continued 100 Fine Castles of Japan in 2017.

Guidance facility of the castle is on site.
