= Ryūun-in (Matsumae) =

Buddhist temple in Hokkaido, Japan

Coordinates: 41°25′53″N 140°06′25″E

Ryūun-in (龍雲院) is a temple in Matsumae, Hokkaidō, Japan. Five of its buildings are Important Cultural Properties.

== History ==
The temple was founded in 1625 and extended from 1842.

== Structures ==
The Hondō, Kuri, Sōmon, Shōrō, and Dozō have all been designated Important Cultural Properties.
