= Shōgyō-ji (Akkeshi) =

Buddhist temple in Hokkaido, Japan

Religion
- Affiliation: Jōdo Shinshū

Location
- Location: Akkeshi, Hokkaidō
- Country: Japan
- Interactive map of Shōgyō-ji
- Coordinates: 43.0357864°N 144.8445°E

Architecture
- Completed: 1879

Shōgyō-ji (正行寺) is a Jōdo Shinshū temple in Akkeshi, Hokkaidō, Japan. Founded in 1879, the Hondō (本堂) of 1799, relocated from Itoigawa in Niigata Prefecture in 1910, has been designated an Important Cultural Property.

== See also ==
- Pure Land Buddhism
