= Esashi Town Historical Museum =

Museum in Hokkaidō, Japan

- 江差町郷土資料館
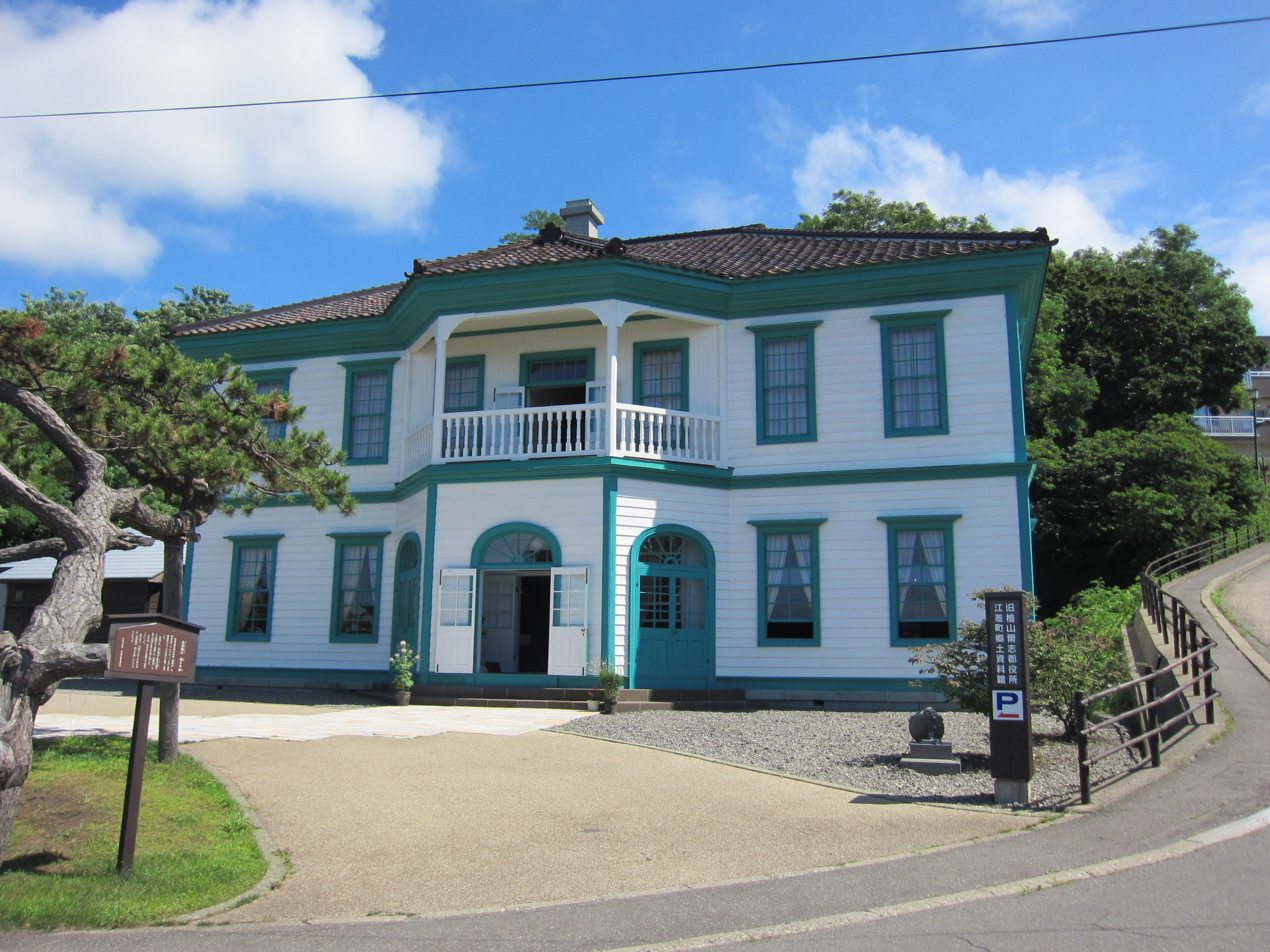

- Location within Hokkaido Location within Japan

General information
- Location: 112 Nakauta-chō, Esashi, Hokkaidō, Japan
- Coordinates: 41°52′05″N 140°07′44″E
- Opened: 2007

Website
- Official website

Esashi Town Historical Museum (江差町郷土資料館, Esashi-chō kyōdo shiryōkan) opened in Esashi, Hokkaidō, Japan in 2007. Dedicated to the nature, history, and way of life of Esashi, exhibits include Jōmon and Zoku-Jōmon artefacts, objects from the Satsumon culture, goods brought by the kitamaebune, and materials relating to the Battle of Hakodate.

The building in which the museum is housed dates to 1887. A former subprefectural government branch office with jurisdiction over the districts of Hiyama and Nishi, it has subsequently served in turn as Esashi Police Station, Esashi Town Hall, and Esashi Town Hall branch building. Restored and opened to the public in 1998, it is the only example of a District Office in Hokkaidō and has been designated a Prefectural Tangible Cultural Property.

== See also ==
- List of Cultural Properties of Japan - structures (Hokkaidō)
- Hiyama Prefectural Natural Park
