= Jōkoku-ji (Kaminokuni) =

Buddhist temple in Hokkaido, Japan

Coordinates: 41°48′0.2″N 140°6′43.7″E

Religion
- Affiliation: Jōdo shū

Location
- Location: Kaminokuni, Hokkaidō
- Country: Japan
- Interactive map of Jōkoku-ji

Architecture
- Completed: Mid-fifteenth century

Jōkoku-ji (上国寺) is a Jōdo shū Buddhist temple in Kaminokuni, Hokkaidō, Japan. Founded as a Shingon temple in the mid-fifteenth century, the Hondō (本堂) of 1757/8 has been designated an Important Cultural Property.

== See also ==
- Pure Land Buddhism
- Cultural Properties of Japan
