= Merriman Colbert Harris =

American Christian missionary to Japan (1846–1921)

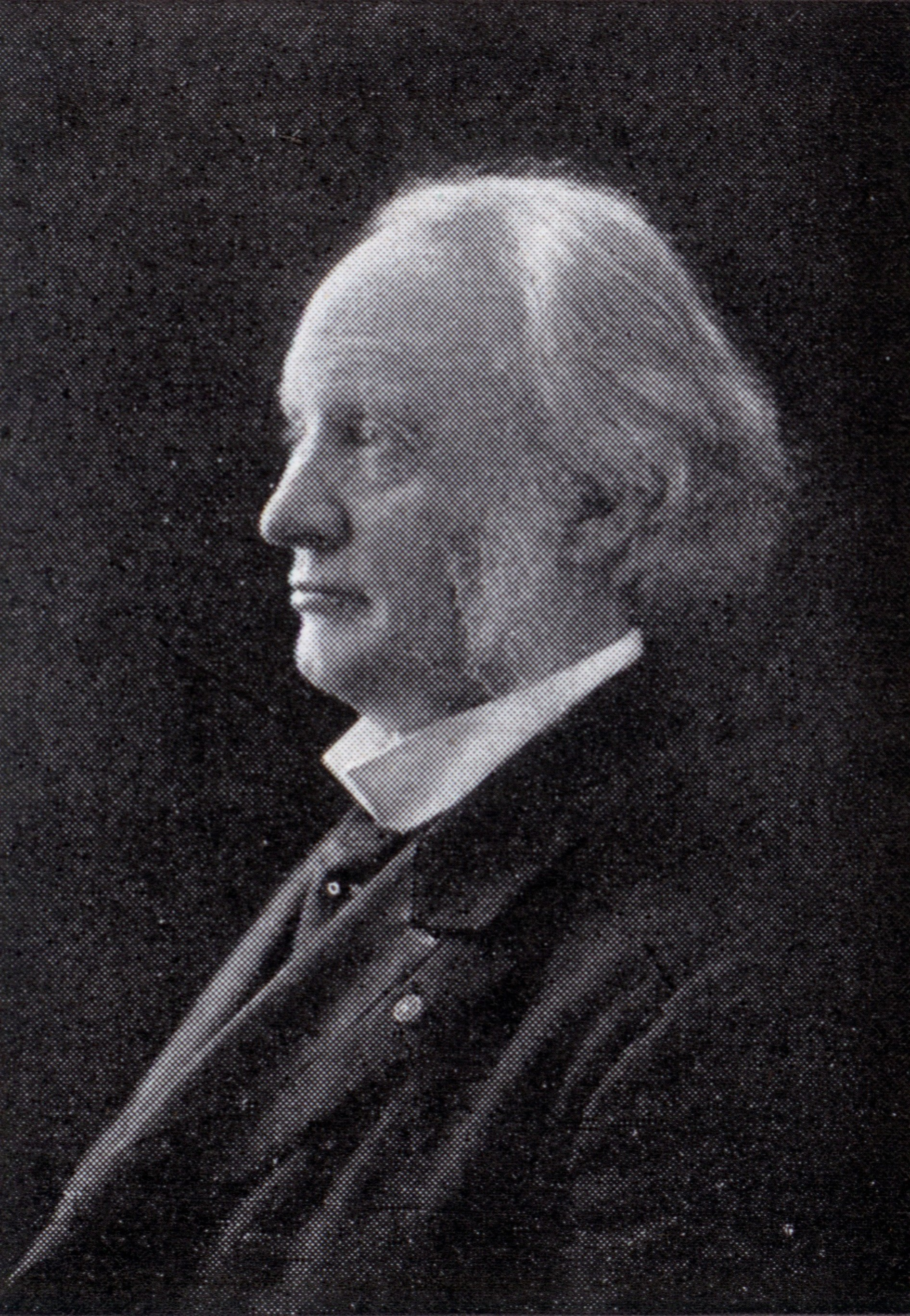
- Born: July 9, 1846; Beallsville, Ohio, U.S.
- Died: May 8, 1921 (aged 74); Aoyama, Tokyo, Japan
- Occupations: Missionary, educator

Merriman Colbert Harris (July 9, 1846 – May 8, 1921) was a Missionary Bishop of the Methodist Episcopal Church, elected in 1904, who was active in late nineteenth and early twentieth century Japan.

== Birth and family ==
Merriman was born July 9, 1846, in Beallsville, Ohio, the son of Colbert and Catherine Elizabeth (Crupper) Harris. Merriman married Flora L. Best on October 23, 1873, in Meadville, Pennsylvania. They had two daughters, Florence and Elizabeth.

== Military service and education ==
Merriman served for three years as a soldier in the 12th Ohio Cavalry in the American Civil War (1863–65), attaining the rank of corporal. Following the end of the war, he attended the Washington Academy in Ohio, and the Harlem Springs Seminary. He then attended Scio College, earning the B.A. degree (1873) and the M.A. degree (1877) from Allegheny College.

== Ordained ministry and missionary service ==
Merriman entered the ministry of the Pittsburgh Annual Conference of the Methodist Episcopal Church in 1869, serving as a pastor and a missionary. He was sent to Japan in 1873 and was stationed at Hakodate on the northern island of Hokkaido. During his first stay in Japan, his converts included Kanzo Uchimura, Inazo Nitobe, and Akira Sato.

Flora Harris helped to found the Iai Joshi Women's Academy in Hakodate. She also carried out translation work, as well as writing over 30 hymns.

He left Japan in 1892, and established Japanese missions on the Pacific Coast of the United States and in Hawaii in areas with large numbers of Japanese emigrants. He became the Superintendent of Japanese missions in San Francisco, California, in 1886. He also served as Superintendent of all Pacific Coast Methodist Japanese missions, including the Hawaiian Islands, in 1890. During this period, Yosuke Matsuoka was one of his converts.

== Episcopal ministry ==
Merriman Colbert Harris was elected a Missionary Bishop by the 1904 General Conference of the M.E. Church. He was assigned Korea and Japan, where he remained until his death. As a Missionary Bishop he served with distinction. He was twice decorated with the Order of the Sacred Treasure by the Emperor of Japan.

In 1919, ten years after the death of his first wife, Flora, he remarried his late wife's first cousin, Elizabeth Best, and lived within the grounds of Aoyama Gakuin, in a home given to him by his Japanese converts. He died May 8, 1921, in Aoyama, Tokyo and his grave is at the Aoyama Cemetery.

== Selected writings ==
- Address: Japanese Buddhism, San Francisco, 1887. Typed, in Methodist Bishops' Collection.
- Christianity in Japan, 1907.
- Save Korea, Quarterly-Centennial Documents, 1910.
- Contributor, Japan Proverbs.
- Statement in Competent Witnesses on Korea as a Mission Field, Korea Documents, with others.

== See also ==
- List of bishops of the United Methodist Church
