= Iai Joshi Women's Academy =

- 遺愛女子中学校・高等学校
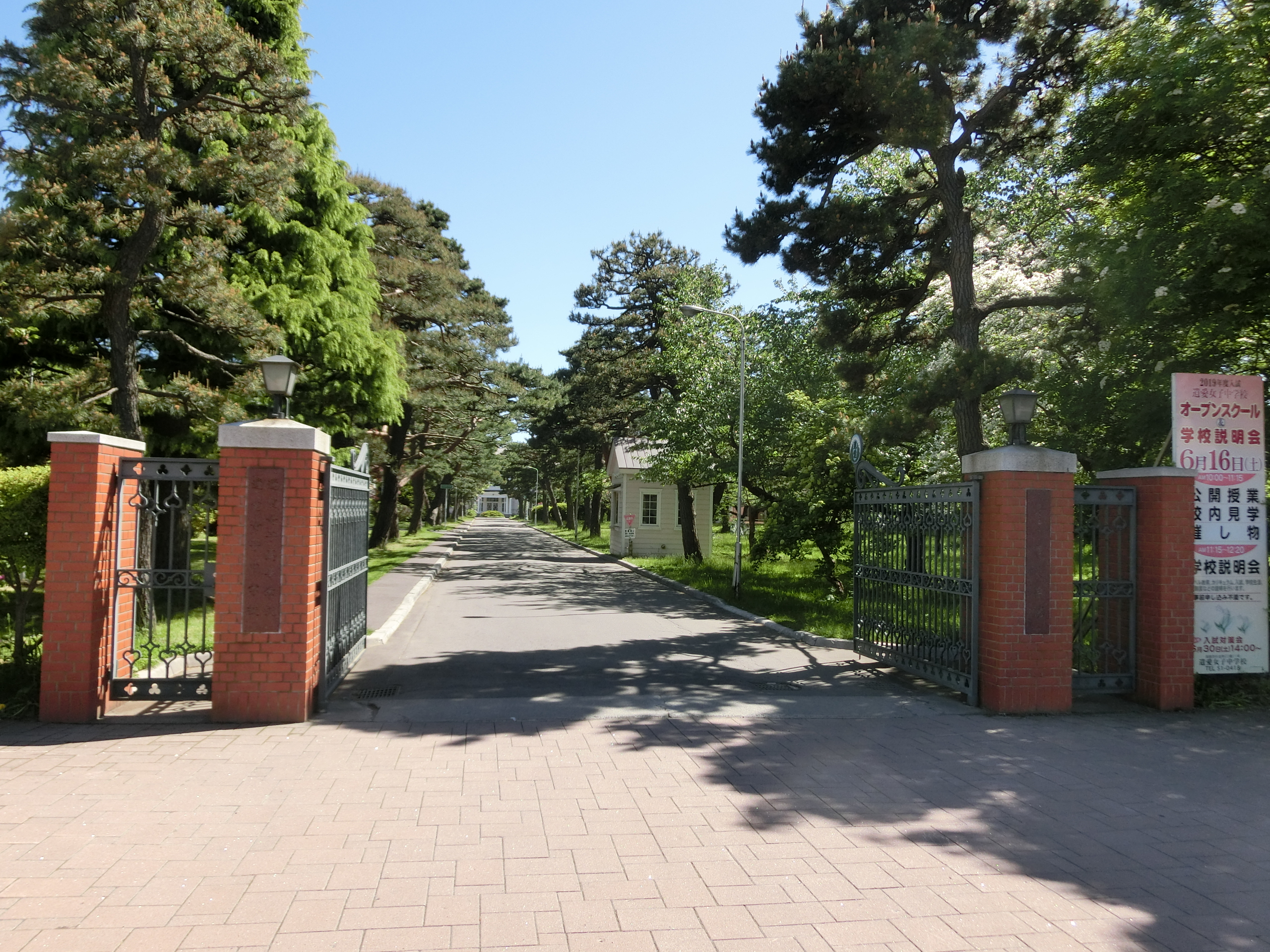

Location
- 23-11 Suginami-chō; Hakodate, Hokkaido, Japan; 041-8543
- Coordinates: 41°47′14.4″N 140°45′24.2″E

Information
- Type: Private
- Established: 1874
- Founders: Merriman Colbert Harris, Flora Harris
- Gender: Girls

Iai Joshi Women's Academy (遺愛女子中学校・高等学校) is a girls' school in Hakodate, Hokkaido, Japan. It consists of Iai Joshi Women's senior and junior high school.

== History ==
Founded by Merriman Colbert Harris and wife Flora Harris in 1874, Iai Joshi Academy is the oldest girls' school in Japan's northernmost island of Hokkaido. In 1873, Harris, a missionary of the Methodist Episcopal Church, was sent to Japan and stationed in Hakodate, one of the first cities in Japan whose ports were opened as a result of the Ansei Treaties. The school started as a "day school" with an attendance of six in its first year.
