= Matsumae, Hokkaido =

Matsumae 松前町
- Town
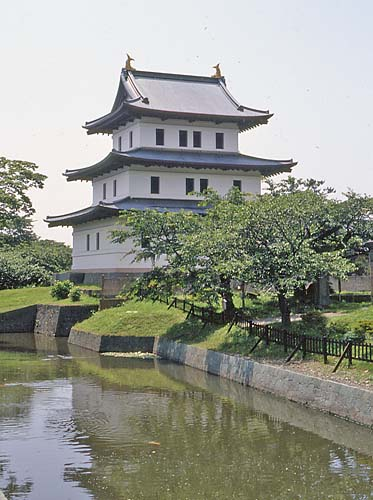
- Matsumae Castle (July 2004)

- Flag Emblem

- Location of Matsumae in Oshima Subprefecture, Hokkaido

- Location in Japan
- Coordinates: 41°26′N 140°7′E
- Country: Japan
- Prefecture: Hokkaido
- District: Matsumae

Government
  - Mayor: Hideo Ishiyama (石山 英雄)

Area
  - Total: 293.11 km^{2} (113.17 sq mi)

Population (2016)
  - Total: 7,843
  - Density: 26.76/km^{2} (69.30/sq mi)
- Time zone: UTC+09:00 (JST)
- Postal code(s): 049-1592
- Area code: 0139
- City hall address: Aza Fukiyama 248, Matsumae-chō, Matsumae-gun, Hokkaidō; 049-1592
- Climate: Cfa
- Website: www.town.matsumae.hokkaido.jp
- Symbols
- Flower: Cherry blossom
- Tree: Pine

Matsumae (松前町, Matsumae-chō) is a town located in Oshima Subprefecture, Hokkaido, Japan. The former home of the Matsumae Han, it has an Edo period castle, Matsumae Castle, the only one in Hokkaido, and Ryūun-in.

The total area of the town is 293.11 square kilometres (113.17 mi^{2}).

== History ==
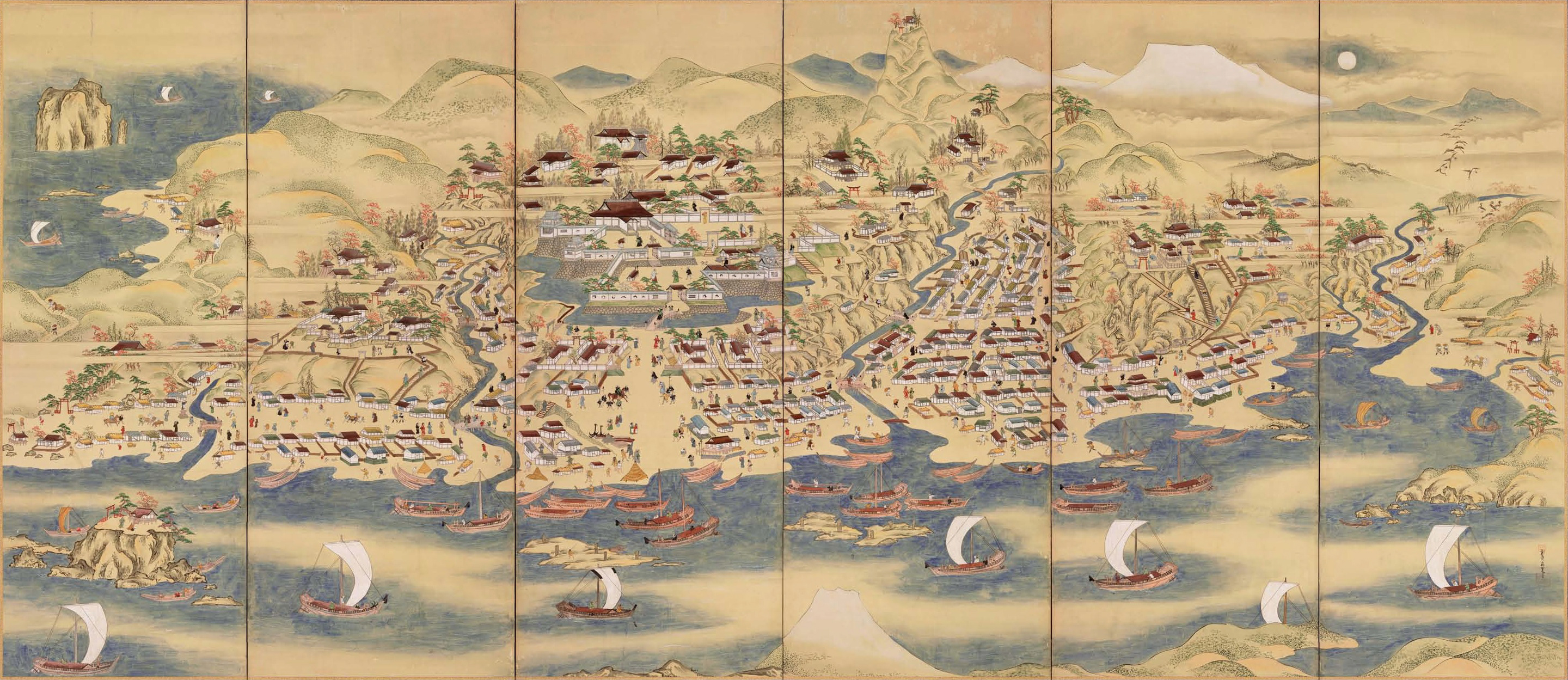
The Matsumae Folding Screen, depicts in detail the castle town bustling with trade circa 1754-1764.

- 1900: Fukuyama town was founded.
- 1940: Fukuyama changed its name to Matsumae.
- 1953: Matsumae Line opened.
- 1954: Matsumae town, Oshima village, Osawa village, and Kojima village were merged to form Matsumae town.
- 1988: Matsumae Line was abolished.

== Geography ==
The town is located on the southern end of the Matsumae Peninsula. In addition the town governs the two islands in the Tsugaru Strait, Oshima and Kojima.

Along with Kaminokuni, Hokkaido, and Fukushima, Hokkaido, Matsumae shares a border with Mount Daisengen, and contains the newest and shortest climbing route to the summit of the mountain.

=== Climate ===
Climate data for Matsumae, Hokkaido (1991−2020 normals, extremes 1977−present)
Month	Jan	Feb	Mar	Apr	May	Jun	Jul	Aug	Sep	Oct	Nov	Dec	Year
Record high °C (°F)	11.1 (52.0)	13.8 (56.8)	15.3 (59.5)	23.3 (73.9)	25.7 (78.3)	29.3 (84.7)	33.3 (91.9)	34.2 (93.6)	31.5 (88.7)	24.9 (76.8)	20.3 (68.5)	15.8 (60.4)	34.2 (93.6)
Mean daily maximum °C (°F)	1.9 (35.4)	2.4 (36.3)	5.8 (42.4)	11.0 (51.8)	15.9 (60.6)	20.0 (68.0)	23.7 (74.7)	25.9 (78.6)	23.1 (73.6)	17.3 (63.1)	10.7 (51.3)	4.5 (40.1)	13.5 (56.3)
Daily mean °C (°F)	−0.5 (31.1)	−0.1 (31.8)	3.0 (37.4)	7.9 (46.2)	12.5 (54.5)	16.6 (61.9)	20.6 (69.1)	22.7 (72.9)	19.8 (67.6)	14.1 (57.4)	7.8 (46.0)	1.9 (35.4)	10.5 (50.9)
Mean daily minimum °C (°F)	−3.0 (26.6)	−2.7 (27.1)	0.1 (32.2)	4.7 (40.5)	9.4 (48.9)	13.5 (56.3)	18.1 (64.6)	20.0 (68.0)	16.7 (62.1)	10.9 (51.6)	4.8 (40.6)	−0.7 (30.7)	7.7 (45.8)
Record low °C (°F)	−11.6 (11.1)	−10.4 (13.3)	−7.9 (17.8)	−3.7 (25.3)	2.2 (36.0)	6.3 (43.3)	10.6 (51.1)	12.6 (54.7)	7.6 (45.7)	2.7 (36.9)	−6.1 (21.0)	−11.4 (11.5)	−11.6 (11.1)
Average precipitation mm (inches)	87.1 (3.43)	72.9 (2.87)	63.9 (2.52)	73.5 (2.89)	97.5 (3.84)	80.0 (3.15)	124.9 (4.92)	157.5 (6.20)	155.2 (6.11)	115.5 (4.55)	122.0 (4.80)	106.0 (4.17)	1,251.3 (49.26)
Average rainy days	18.4	15.5	13.3	10.3	10.2	8.7	10.4	9.8	11.5	12.4	15.7	18.9	155.1
Mean monthly sunshine hours	46.9	66.7	132.3	175.7	173.4	159.2	137.4	170.3	171.1	153.3	82.1	50.1	1,518.5
Source 1: JMA
Source 2: JMA

== Demographics ==
As of September 2016, the town has an estimated population of 7,843 and a density of 26.7 persons per km^{2}.

== Culture and lifestyle ==
Surrounding Matsumae Castle is Matsumae Park, which features over 10,000 cherry trees of over 250 varieties, and is ranked among the top cherry blossom viewing spots in the country.

== Education ==
=== High school ===
- Hokkaido Matsumae High School (the southernmost high school in Hokkaido)

== Sister cities ==
- Omihachiman, Shiga (since 1984)
- Masaki, Ehime (since 1990)
- Date, Fukushima (since 2011)
