= Esashi Station =

Former railway station in Esashi, Hokkaido, Japan

Coordinates: 41.8563°N 140.1282°E

Esashi Station 江差駅
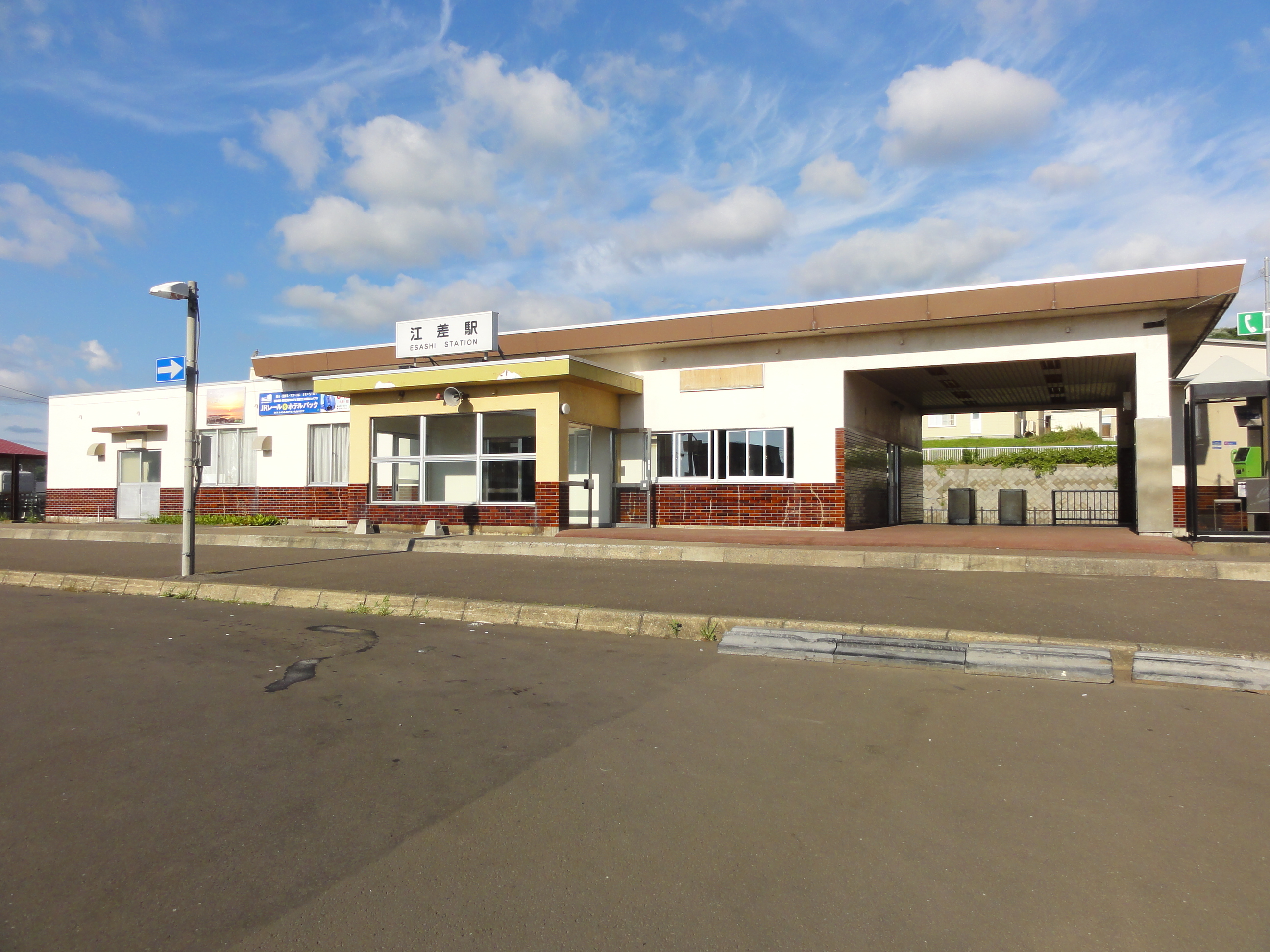
- Esashi Station in August 2011

General information
- Location: Esashi, Hiyama District, Hokkaido; Japan
- Operator: JR Hokkaido
- Line: Esashi Line
- Platforms: 1 side platform
- Tracks: 1

History
- Opened: 10 November 1936
- Closed: 11 May 2014
Location
- Location within Hokkaido Location within Japan

Esashi Station (江差駅, Esashi-eki) was a railway station on the Esashi Line in Esashi, Hokkaido, Japan, operated by Hokkaido Railway Company (JR Hokkaido). It opened in 1936 and closed in May 2014.

== Lines ==
Esashi Station was formerly the terminus of the non-electrified section of the Esashi Line from Kikonai.

== Station layout ==
The station consisted of a single side platform serving a single terminating track.

== Adjacent stations ==
«	Service	»
Esashi Line
Kaminokuni	Local	Terminus

== History ==
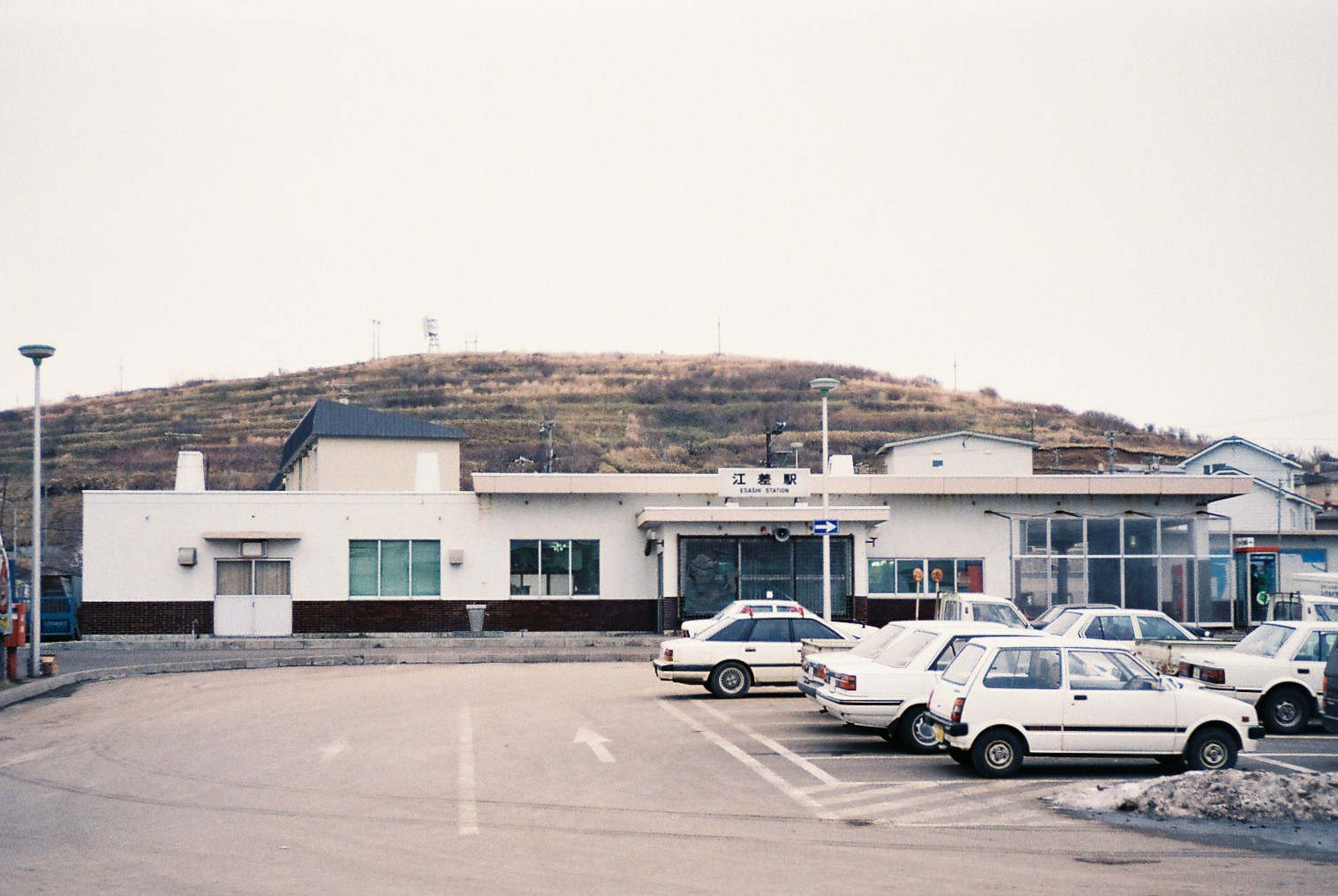
The station in December 1987

Esashi Station opened on 10 November 1936. With the privatization of Japanese National Railways (JNR) on 1 April 1987, the station came under the control of JR Hokkaido. The station closed in 2014, with the last services on the line running on 11 May.

== See also ==
- List of railway stations in Japan
