= Kaminokuni =

Kaminokuni 上ノ国町
- Town
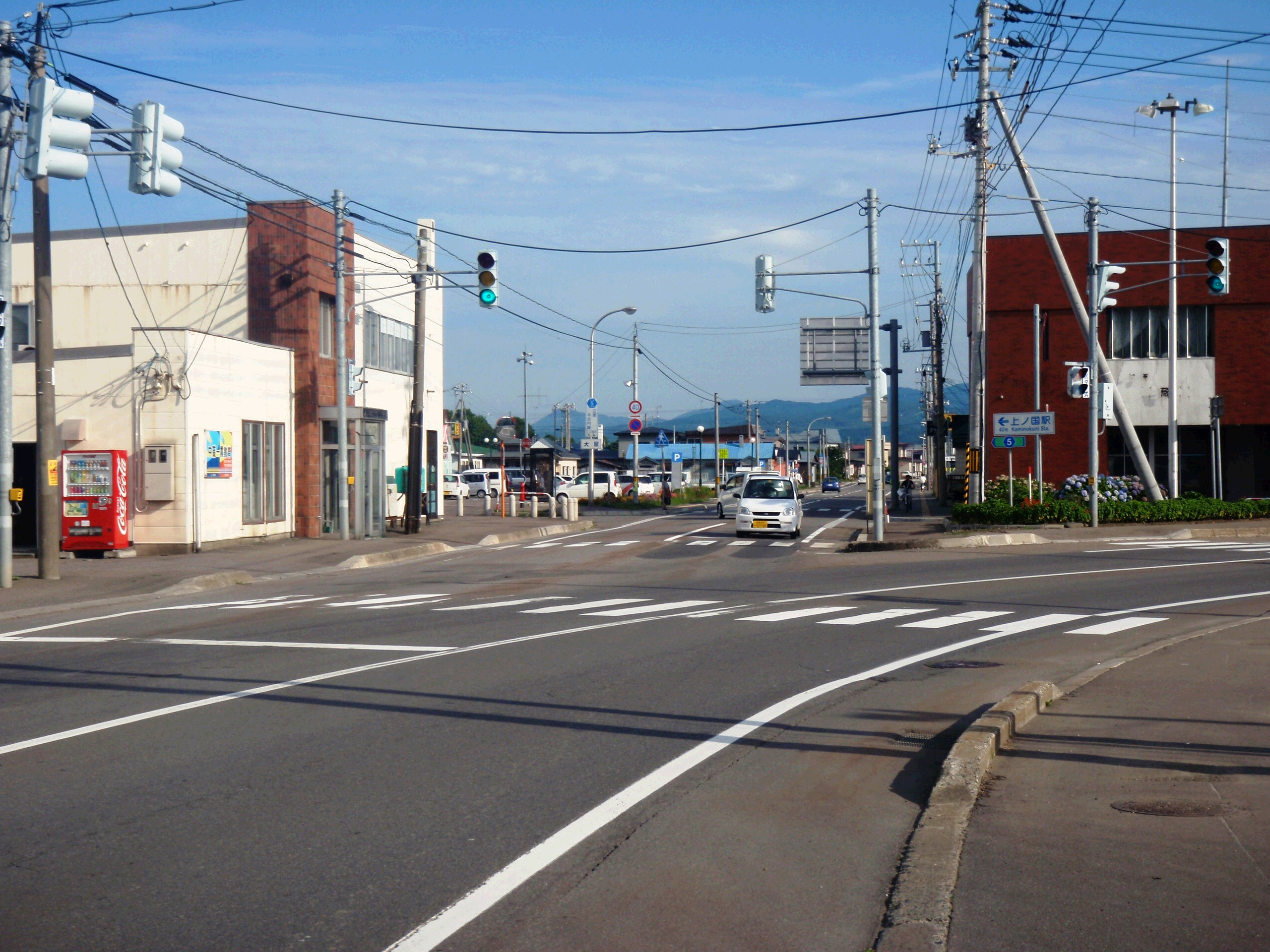
- Center of Kaminokuni-chō

- Flag Emblem

- Location of Kaminokuni in Hokkaido (Hiyama Subprefecture)

- Location in Japan
- Coordinates: 41°48′N 140°7′E
- Country: Japan
- Region: Hokkaido
- Prefecture: Hokkaido (Hiyama Subprefecture)
- District: Hiyama

Government
  - Mayor: Nomoru Kudo

Area
  - Total: 547.58 km^{2} (211.42 sq mi)

Population (September 30, 2016)
  - Total: 5,161
  - Density: 9.425/km^{2} (24.41/sq mi)
- Time zone: UTC+09:00 (JST)
- City hall address: 100 Odomari, Kaminokuni, Hiyama District, Hokkaido; 049-0698
- Website: www.town.kaminokuni.lg.jp
- Symbols
- Flower: Ezoyamatsutsuji
- Tree: Thujopsis

Kaminokuni (上ノ国町, Kaminokuni-chō) is a town located in Hiyama Subprefecture, Hokkaido, Japan.

As of September 2016, the town had an estimated population of 5,161, and a density of 9.4 per km^{2}. The total area is 547.58 km^{2}.

== Geography ==
Kaminokuni is located on the southwest of the Oshima Peninsula and faces the Sea of Japan. Amano River flows through the central town. Esashi Line used to run along this river.

=== Neighboring towns ===
- Hiyama Subprefecture
  - Assabu
  - Esashi
- Oshima Subprefecture
  - Fukushima
  - Kikonai
  - Matsumae
  - Shiriuchi

== History ==
Strongman Takeda Nobuhiro (1431–1494), progenitor of the Kakizaki (later Matsumae) house, established a fort (tate) in Kaminokuni leading to the settlement of the area by other Wajin merchants and fishermen.

- 1879: The village of Kaminokuni was founded.
- 1902: Kaminokuni Village was merged with neighboring villages to form the new village of Kaminokuni.
- 1967: Kaminokuni Village became Kaminokuni Town.

== Education ==
- High school
  - Hokkaido Kaminokuni High School
- Junior high school
  - Kaminokuni Junior High School (上ノ国中学校)
- Elementary school
  - Kahoku Elementary School (河北小学校)
  - Kaminokuni Elementary School (上ノ国小学校)
  - Takisawa Elementary School (滝沢小学校)

== Sister cities ==
- (Aomori Prefecture) Goshogawara, Aomori
- (Shiga Prefecture) Omihachiman, Shiga

== Notable people from Kaminokuni ==
- Tatsuhiko Takimoto, author
