= Hiyama District, Hokkaido =

District in Hokkaido, Japan

Coordinates: 41.429°N 140.286°E

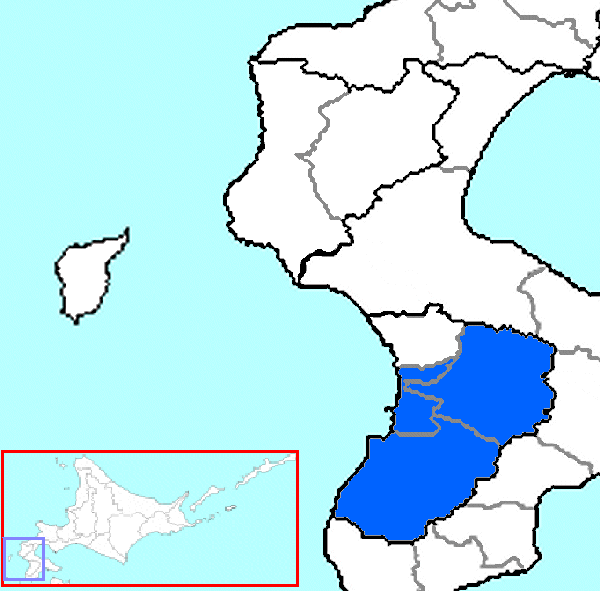
The area of Hiyama District in Hiyama Subprefecture.

Hiyama (檜山郡, Hiyama-gun) is a district located in Hiyama Subprefecture, Hokkaido, Japan.

As of 2004, the district has an estimated population of 21,896 and a density of 19.59 persons per km^{2}. The total area is 1,117.57 km^{2}.

== Towns and villages ==
- Assabu
- Esashi
- Kaminokuni

== Notable place ==
- Katsuyama Date - A castle ruin, was listed as one of the National Historic Site and Continued 100 Fine Castles of Japan.
