= Kamui (disambiguation) =

A kamui is a spiritual or divine being in Ainu mythology, a term denoting a supernatural entity composed of or possessing spiritual energy.

Kamui may also refer to:

== People and groups ==
- Kamui Fujiwara (born 1959), Japanese game designer and cartoonist
- Kamui Kobayashi (born 1986), Japanese racing driver
- Gackt (born 1973), Japanese musician who has possible legal surname Camui

== Fiction ==
- Kamui (1964 manga), a manga series by Sanpei Shirato
- Kamui (2001 manga), a manga series by Shingo Nanami
- Kamui the Ninja, a 1969 anime television series based on the Shirato manga
- Kamui Gaiden, a 2009 live-action film adaptation of the Shirato manga
- Ninja Kamui, a 2024 anime series that aired on Adult Swim's Toonami block
- The Dagger of Kamui, a Japanese novel series
- Kamui, a character in the manga Gintama
- Kamui Shiro, a character in the manga X
- Kamui, default name for the Avatar in the Japanese version of Fire Emblem Fates (Fire Emblem If)
- Kamui, a character in Fire Emblem Gaiden and its remake, Fire Emblem Echoes: Shadows of Valentia
- Kamui (神衣), an outfit giving the wearer godlike abilities, in the anime Kill la Kill
- Kamui (神威), a powerful teleportation technique in the manga Naruto
- Kamui, the body armors of the twelve Olympians in the manga Saint Seiya
- Kanna Kamui, a character in the manga Miss Kobayashi's Dragon Maid
- Kamui, a summoned monster in the video game Monster Rancher 2
- Kamui Tokinomiya (朱鷺宮 神依), a character in the video game series Arcana Heart
- Kamui Woods, a character in the manga My Hero Academia
- Kirito Kamui (鹿矛囲 桐斗), a villain in the second season of Psycho-Pass
- Kamui Uehara, a central antagonist in the video game The Silver Case
- Kamui, the name of Teddie's reborn persona once his social link reaches rank 10 in the video game Persona 4
- Kamui, the northern and final major area in the video game Ōkami

== Other uses ==
- Mount Kamui (disambiguation)
- Kamui Tips, a Japanese manufacturer of billiard and pool cue tips
- Kamui (train), a train service in Hokkaido, Japan
- HD 145457, a star also named Kamuy
