= Okushiri =

Okushiri may refer to

- Okushiri Island
- Okushiri, Hokkaido, the main town on the island
