= Sibiryakov (disambiguation) =

Sibiryakov is a surname.

Sibiryakov may also refer to:

== Places ==
- Mount Sibiryakov, in Antarctica
- Sibiryakov Island, in the Kara Sea
- Sibiryakov Island (Primorsky Krai), in the Sea of Japan

== Ships ==
- A. Sibiryakov (icebreaker), launched 1909, sunk 1942
- Jääkarhu, Finnish icebreaker launched 1926, turned over to Soviets in 1945 and renamed Sibiryakov, broken up 1972
- Sibiryakov (research vessel), launched 1990
