= Kamome Island =

Island in the country of Japan

Kamome
Native name: 鷗島, Kamome Jima
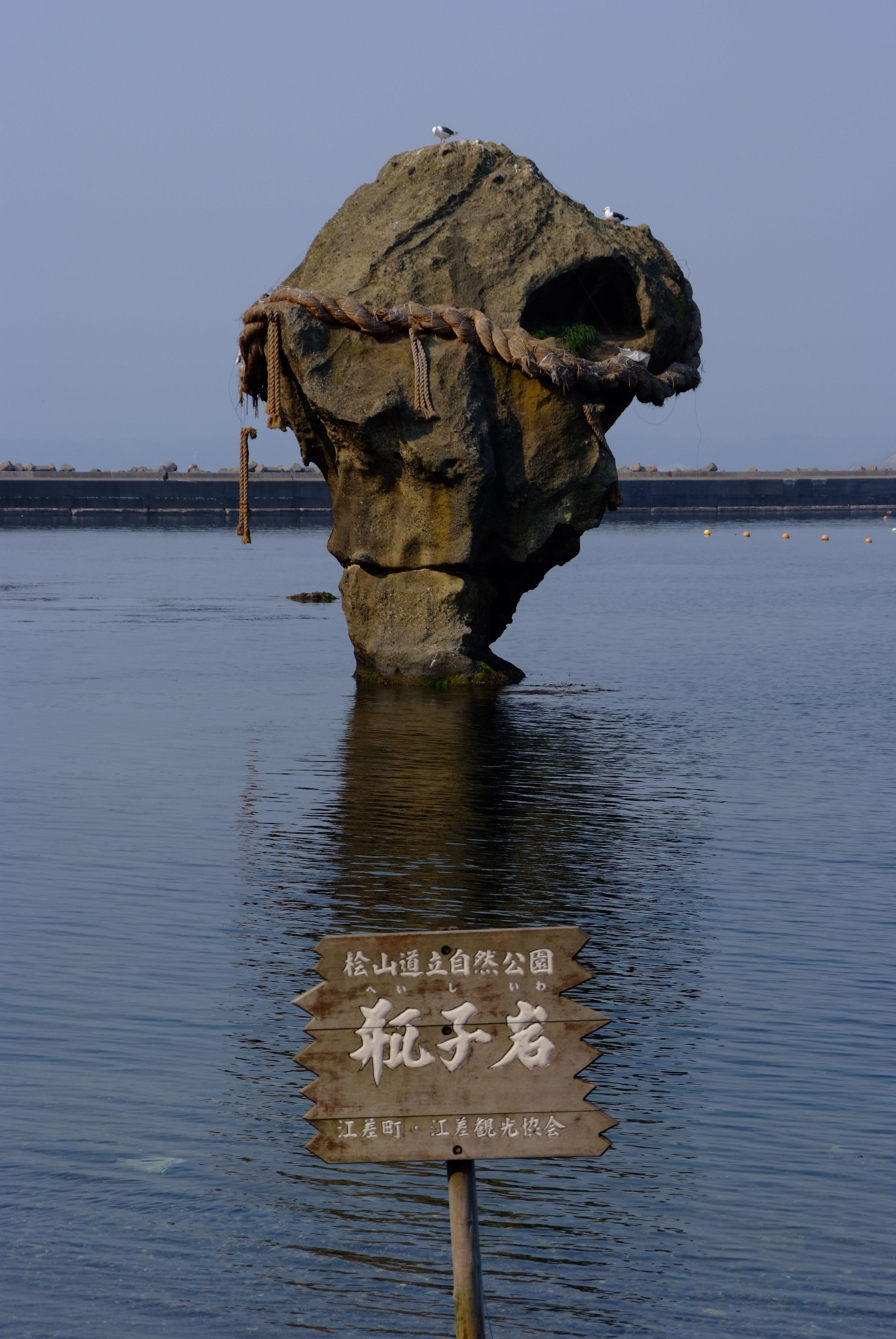
- Heishi Rock is an attraction at Kamome Island.(April 2007)
- Interactive map of Kamome

Geography
- Location: East Asia
- Coordinates: 41.867781°N 140.1143°E
- Archipelago: Japanese archipelago
- Coastline: 2.6 km (1.62 mi)
- Highest elevation: 27.6 m (90.6 ft)
- Highest point: Mount Kamui

Administration
- Japan
- Prefectures: Hokkaidō
- Subprefectures: Hiyama Subprefecture
- District: Hiyama District

Kamome Island (鷗島, Kamome Jima) is an island (or more precisely, peninsula) in the Sea of Japan just off the coast of the town of Esashi, Hokkaidō, Japan. The island serves as a breakwater for the Esashi port. It has several historical sites and is protected as a part of the Hiyama Prefectural Natural Park. Every July, there is a two-day festival that attracts tourists to the island. People visit the island throughout the year for swimming, camping, fishing and other recreational activities.

== Geography ==
Kamome Island is part of the coastal terrace, being mostly flat. It rises just 27.6 meters (91 ft) above sea level. The island has a width of about 200 meters (660 ft), a length of about 1 kilometer (0.62 mi) and a coastline of 2.6 kilometers (1.6 mi). It is connected with the mainland by a 500 meters (1,600 ft) long sandbank and thus is accessible by road. As the island stretches roughly from north to south and the mainland lies to the east, the island naturally serves as a coastal protection from sea waves. An additional wave breaker line was built to extend this protection to the north. However, the western coast of the island is severely eroded by the waves.

== History ==
The island once served as a natural port for Edo period ships trading with Hokkaidō or for fishermen seeking to catch Pacific Herring.

The herring fishery is also reflected in the legend of the Heishi rock. This 500-year-old legend says that once when herring vanished, an old woman (a fortune teller) was given a bottle with magic liquid. She threw the bottle into the sea and the herring returned. The bottle stuck to the seabed and turned into a rock, which became a representation of the god of the Sea of Japan.

In 1615, a group of merchants raised a shrine on the island to honor the god of the Sea of Japan, and in 1868 it was renamed into Itsukushima Shrine. In 1814, a monument to Matsuo Bashō, the most famous poet of the Edo period in Japan, was installed near the shrine.

For a long time, the island had problems with fresh water, which was important for passing ships to replenish their supplies. So, in 1876, a merchant from Esashi named Murakami spent a significant amount of money to build a water well on the island. Around that time, the island was also dragged into conflicts between different Japanese clans, and in 1852, two cannons were brought to the island for protecting it and the Esashi city.

=== Name ===
The elongated shape of the island resembles a seagull, which is the basis of its name, Kamome, which means "seagull". During the Edo period, it was called Bentenjima (弁天島). Many Japanese islands formerly shared this name, after the Hindu goddess Saraswati, known as Benzaiten (弁才天) in Japanese Buddhism and Shinto, because she has traditionally been worshipped as a goddess of water and guardian of fishermen.

== Flora and fauna ==
A constant west wind keeps the island largely grass-covered, but it is also home to Painted Maple and Mongolian Oak. The waters around the island are rich in aquafauna, namely Arabesque greenling and righteye flounder in spring, Hexagrammos otakii (a Japanese species of greenling) in summer, mackerel and Japanese amberjack in autumn, and Arabesque greenling and octopus in winter.

== Human uses ==
The island is a tourist destination with fishing and hiking all through the year. The beaches are used for swimming in summer.

=== Religious uses ===
The first weekend of July, the Kamome Island Matsuri, pays tribute to the legend of Heishi Rock. A group of young men receive a blessing at a local shrine. They then proceed to swim to the rock, dressed only in the traditional fundoshi, climb on top, and renew the 30-metre shimenawa that embraces the rock. The ritual rope weighs some 500 kilograms (1,100 lb). The festival lasts two days it focuses on the changing of the rope, but also includes a rowing competition, a parade of people dressed in traditional costumes, Taiko and singing performances, and a karaoke contest.
