= Mount Kamui =

Mount Kamui may refer to:

- Mount Kamui (Lake Mashū caldera), a stratovolcano of the Lake Mashū caldera in Akan National park in Hokkaidō
- Mount Kamui (Niikappu-Kasai), a mountain in the Hidaka Mountains between the Niikappu and Kasai districts in Hokkaidō
- Mount Kamui (Okushiri), the highest point on Okushiri Island, Hokkaidō
- Mount Kamui (Urakawa-Hirō), a mountain in the Hidaka Mountains between the Urakawa and Hirō districts in Hokkaidō
