= Hiyama Prefectural Natural Park =

National park in Japan

- 檜山道立自然公園
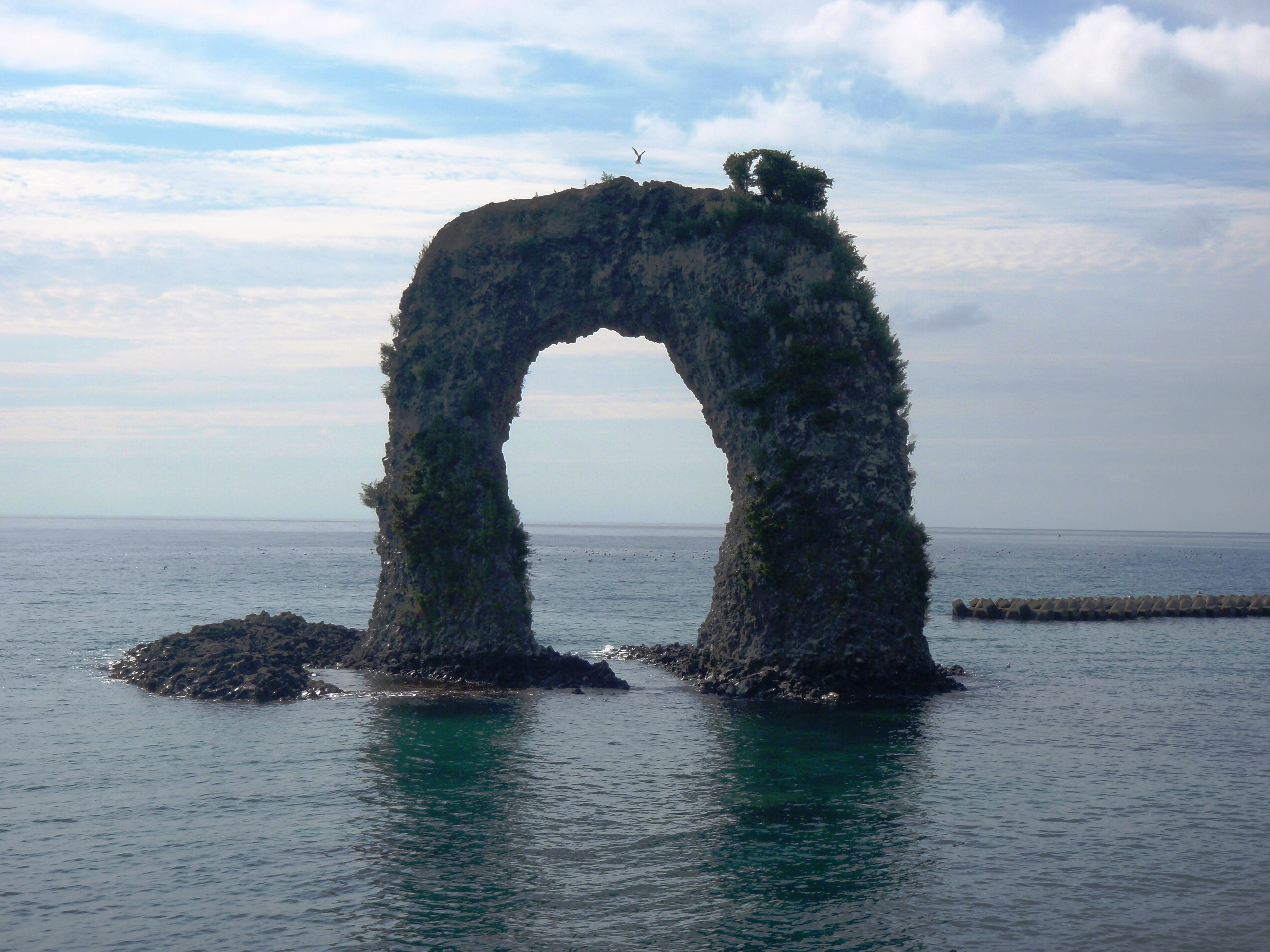
- Nabetsuru Iwa, Okushiri Island
- Interactive map of Hiyama Prefectural Natural Park
- Location: Hokkaidō, Japan
- Coordinates: 41.8664°N 140.1136°E
- Area: 170.13 km^{2} (65.69 mi^{2})
- Established: 20 April 1960

Hiyama Prefectural Natural Park (檜山道立自然公園, Hiyama dōritsu shizen kōen) is a Prefectural Natural Park in southwest Hokkaidō, Japan. Established in 1960, the park spans the municipalities of Esashi, Kaminokuni, Okushiri, Otobe, Setana, and Yakumo. Notable islands within the park include Okushiri Island and Kamome Island.
