= Esashi, Hokkaido (Hiyama) =

Esashi 江差町
- Town
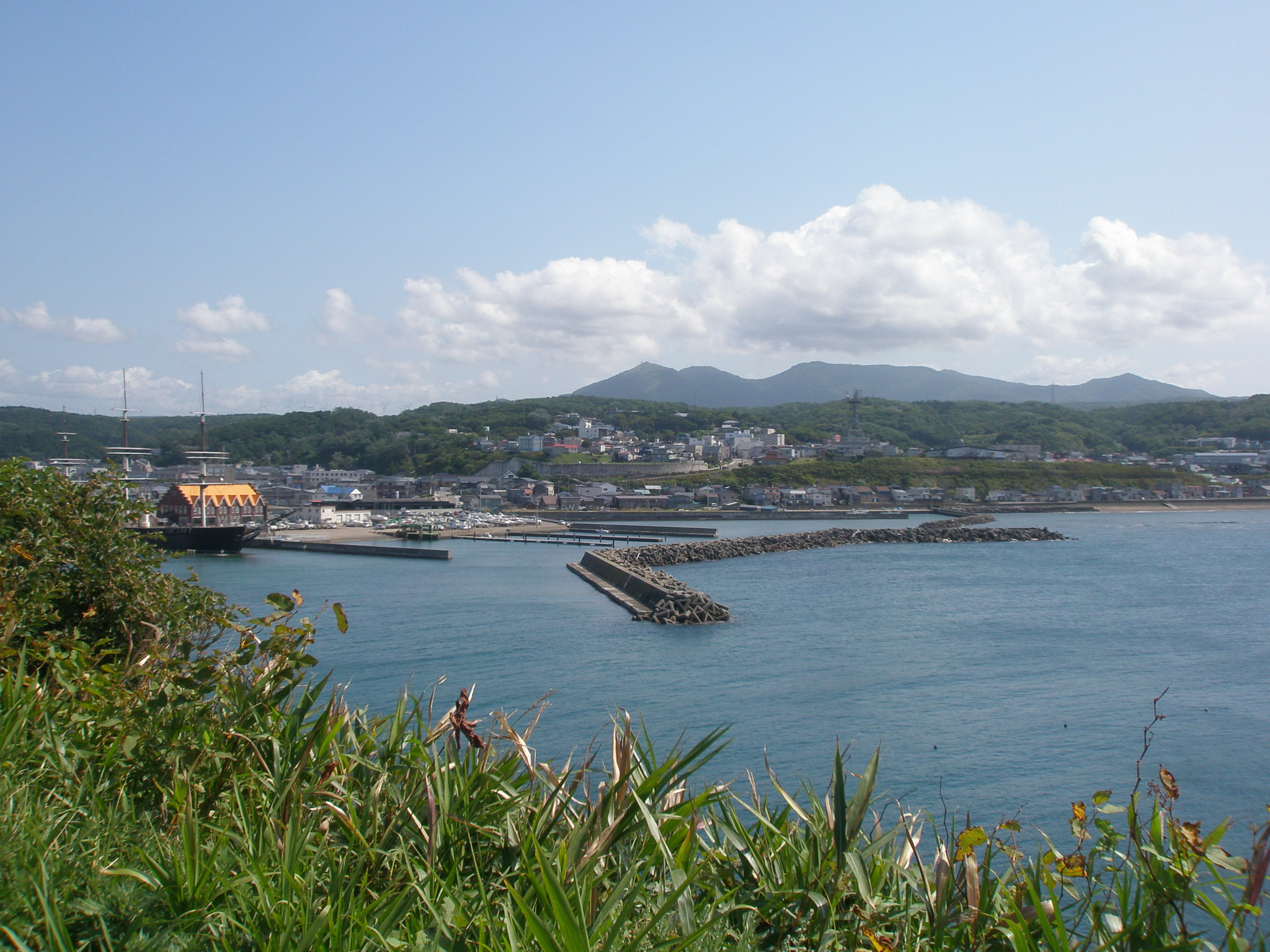
- View of Esashi from Kamome Island

- Flag Emblem

- Location of Esashi in Hokkaido (Hiyama Subprefecture)

- Location in Japan
- Coordinates: 41°52′N 140°8′E
- Country: Japan
- Region: Hokkaido
- Prefecture: Hokkaido (Hiyama Subprefecture)
- District: Hiyama

Government
  - Mayor: Yonosuke Terui

Area
  - Total: 109.57 km^{2} (42.31 sq mi)

Population (September 30, 2016)
  - Total: 8,117
  - Density: 74.08/km^{2} (191.9/sq mi)
- Time zone: UTC+09:00 (JST)
- City hall address: 193-1 Aza-Nakauta-chō, Esashi-chō, Hiyama-gun, Hokkaidō; 043-8560
- Climate: Cfa
- Website: www.hokkaido-esashi.jp
- Symbols
- Flower: Japanese Rose
- Tree: Thujopsis

Esashi (江差町, Esashi-chō) is a town in Hiyama Subprefecture, Hokkaido, Japan. It is the capital of Hiyama Subprefecture.

One of the oldest towns in Hokkaido, the name Esashi comes from the Ainu word for kombu, a type of edible kelp well known in Japan. It is the birthplace of a folk music tradition called Esashi oiwake.

== Geography ==
Esashi is a district and port town located on the western seaboard of Hokkaido on the Assabugawa river, facing the Sea of Japan. Its eastern part is mountainous. The town is bordered by the municipalities of Kaminokuni, Assabu and Otobe. It has a ferry connection to Okushiri island. The rail link was discontinued in 2014; Esashi Station was the terminus of the Esashi Line.

Kamome Island in the town is part of Hiyama Prefectural Natural Park.

=== Climate ===
Esashi has a hot humid continental climate (Köppen climate classification Dfa), bordering on a humid subtropical climate (Cfa) with far less snow in winter than elsewhere in Hokkaido due to the influence of the warming tsushima-kairyu ocean current.

Climate data for Esashi (1991−2020 normals, extremes 1941−present)
Month	Jan	Feb	Mar	Apr	May	Jun	Jul	Aug	Sep	Oct	Nov	Dec	Year
Record high °C (°F)	11.4 (52.5)	15.4 (59.7)	18.8 (65.8)	23.7 (74.7)	27.2 (81.0)	30.5 (86.9)	34.0 (93.2)	34.6 (94.3)	33.6 (92.5)	28.0 (82.4)	23.0 (73.4)	15.5 (59.9)	34.6 (94.3)
Mean maximum °C (°F)	7.3 (45.1)	8.6 (47.5)	12.6 (54.7)	18.3 (64.9)	22.7 (72.9)	25.8 (78.4)	28.7 (83.7)	30.1 (86.2)	28.1 (82.6)	22.5 (72.5)	17.6 (63.7)	11.4 (52.5)	30.8 (87.4)
Mean daily maximum °C (°F)	1.8 (35.2)	2.3 (36.1)	5.8 (42.4)	11.1 (52.0)	15.8 (60.4)	19.8 (67.6)	23.8 (74.8)	25.9 (78.6)	23.0 (73.4)	17.1 (62.8)	10.4 (50.7)	4.3 (39.7)	13.4 (56.1)
Daily mean °C (°F)	−0.6 (30.9)	−0.2 (31.6)	2.9 (37.2)	7.7 (45.9)	12.3 (54.1)	16.4 (61.5)	20.6 (69.1)	22.6 (72.7)	19.5 (67.1)	13.7 (56.7)	7.5 (45.5)	1.6 (34.9)	10.3 (50.6)
Mean daily minimum °C (°F)	−3.3 (26.1)	−3.0 (26.6)	−0.3 (31.5)	4.2 (39.6)	8.9 (48.0)	13.5 (56.3)	18.0 (64.4)	19.7 (67.5)	15.9 (60.6)	9.8 (49.6)	4.1 (39.4)	−1.1 (30.0)	7.2 (45.0)
Mean minimum °C (°F)	−8.3 (17.1)	−8.4 (16.9)	−5.7 (21.7)	−0.7 (30.7)	3.6 (38.5)	9.0 (48.2)	14.1 (57.4)	15.1 (59.2)	10.3 (50.5)	4.1 (39.4)	−1.9 (28.6)	−6.3 (20.7)	−9.3 (15.3)
Record low °C (°F)	−12.7 (9.1)	−11.9 (10.6)	−10.6 (12.9)	−4.0 (24.8)	0.0 (32.0)	5.3 (41.5)	9.0 (48.2)	10.7 (51.3)	5.4 (41.7)	0.2 (32.4)	−6.7 (19.9)	−11.3 (11.7)	−12.7 (9.1)
Average precipitation mm (inches)	84.9 (3.34)	68.4 (2.69)	63.6 (2.50)	74.7 (2.94)	98.0 (3.86)	78.6 (3.09)	126.4 (4.98)	167.0 (6.57)	135.6 (5.34)	105.5 (4.15)	118.6 (4.67)	109.5 (4.31)	1,230.7 (48.45)
Average snowfall cm (inches)	77 (30)	60 (24)	26 (10)	1 (0.4)	0 (0)	0 (0)	0 (0)	0 (0)	0 (0)	0 (0)	11 (4.3)	71 (28)	219 (86)
Average rainy days	18.6	15.3	11.7	9.2	9.7	8.1	9.6	9.4	10.5	12.5	15.9	19.6	150.1
Average snowy days	20.3	16.9	7.7	0.4	0	0	0	0	0	0	1.9	13.3	60.5
Average relative humidity (%)	67	67	66	70	77	80	82	80	74	69	67	67	72
Mean monthly sunshine hours	34.9	57.5	123.3	169.9	179.3	163.4	138.5	165.1	162.3	138.4	65.6	33.1	1,431.2
Source 1: JMA
Source 2: JMA

== Demographics ==
Per Japanese census data, the population of Esashi has declined steadily in recent decades.

Historical population
Year	Pop.	±%
1970	14,896	—
1980	13,930	−6.5%
1990	12,234	−12.2%
2000	10,959	−10.4%
2010	9,004	−17.8%
2020	7,428	−17.5%

== Culture ==
The area is home to Esashi Oiwake, a traditional Japanese folk music derived from mago-uta verses from Shinshu which spread throughout Japan during the Edo era and have become an Esashi art form. The district holds a national oiwake convention each September. The oiwake musician 青坂満 comes from Esashi.

The ubagami-daijingu dogyo festival, based around the ubagami-daijingu shrine, is celebrated in August.

Esashi was the subject of the 1992 single Esashi love-song by Yuka Õne.

The town also has a celebrated historical dance: Doba Shishimai. The dance's three acts include a Shinto ritual dance of three fawns, a pestle-swinging dance and a dance of hinds quarreling over a fawn.

Esashi has an official sister town, Notogawa (now part of Higashiо̄mi city) in Shiga prefecture. It also has official friendship status with Suzu city in Ishikawa prefecture.

== History ==
In the Edo period, Esashi grew wealthy as a herring fishing town. The town's prosperity coined a saying, "Even Edo is not as busy as Esashi in May" and visitors to the town described the herring as being so plentiful that it turned the color of the sea white.

Several Meiji-era residences of those who grew wealthy on the trade are preserved in the town today, including the Sekikawa family country house and the Nakamura family house. The majority of Esashi's historic buildings are located on Esashi Inishie Road.

The fisheries failed around the turn of end of the 19th century and the town tried to replace its major industry with tourism. The town advertised itself using the Min'yo classical Japanese folk song, the main part of which was originally from the village of Oiwake in central Japan, but became known as Esashi Oiwake as the town's version gained renown.

- 1900: Esashi Town became a First Class Village.
- 1955: Esashi Town and Tomari Village were merged to form the new town of Esashi.

== Education ==
- High school
  - Hokkaido Esashi High School
- Junior high schools
  - Esashi Junior High School (江差町立江差中学校)
  - Esashi Kita (North) Junior High School (江差町立江差北中学校)
- Elementary schools
  - Esashi Elementary School (江差町立江差小学校)
  - Esashi Kita Elementary School (江差町立江差北小学校)
  - Minamigaoka Elementary School (江差町立南が丘小学校)

== Sister cities ==
- (Ishikawa Prefecture) Suzu, Ishikawa
- (Shiga Prefecture) Higashiomi, Shiga
