= Okushiri Island =

Japanese island

Okushiri
Native name: 奥尻島, Okushiri-tō
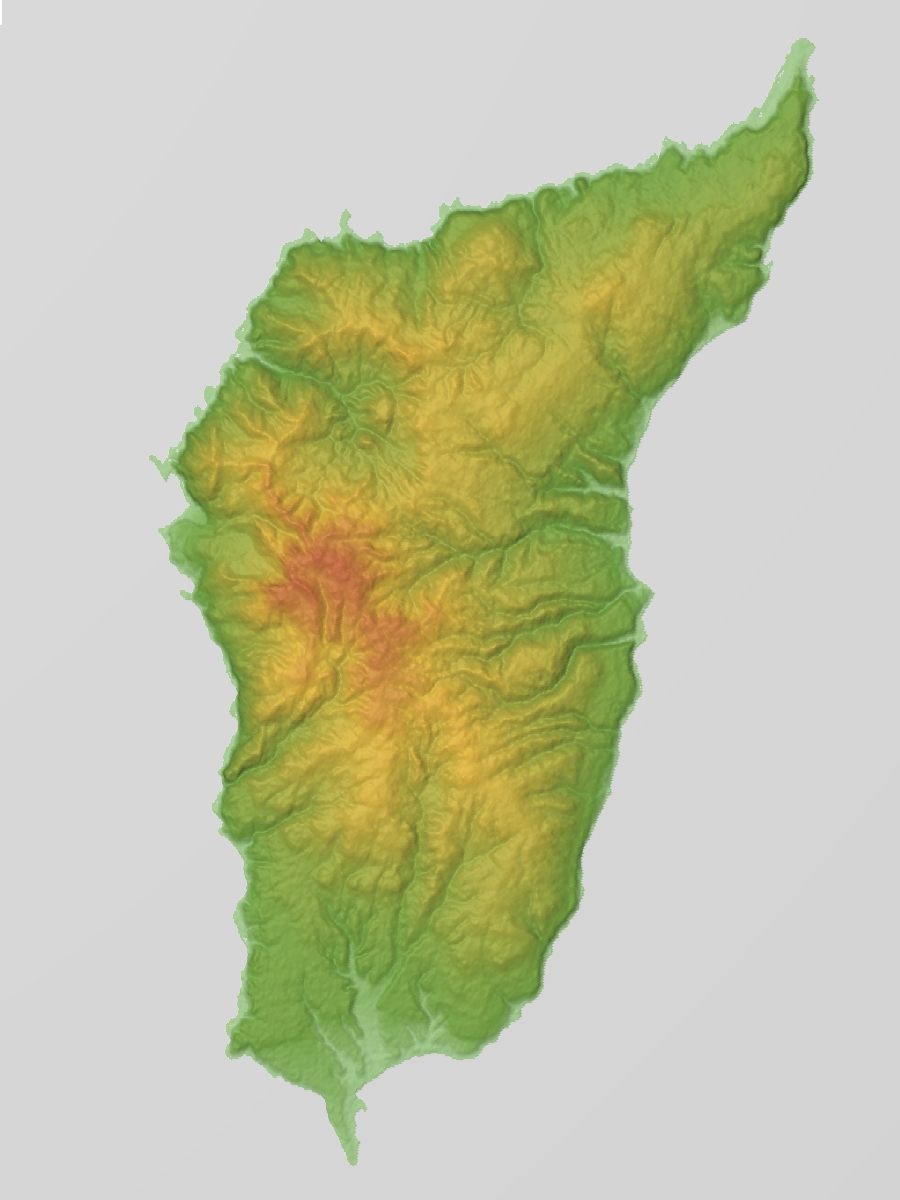
- Relief Map

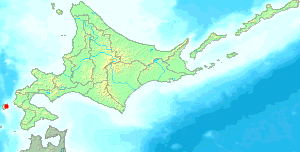
- Location of Okushiri off Hokkaido

Geography
- Location: East Asia
- Coordinates: 42°08′57″N 139°28′02″E
- Archipelago: Japanese archipelago
- Area: 142.97 km^{2} (55.20 sq mi)
- Length: 27 km (16.8 mi)
- Width: 11 km (6.8 mi)
- Coastline: 84 km (52.2 mi)
- Highest elevation: 584 m (1916 ft)
- Highest point: Mount Kamui

Administration
- Japan
- Prefecture: Hokkaido
- Subprefecture: Hiyama Subprefecture
- District: Okushiri District
- Town: Okushiri

Demographics
- Population: 3343 (2009-03-31)
- Pop. density: 23.4/km^{2} (60.6/sq mi)
- Ethnic groups: Japanese

Okushiri Island, 2017.

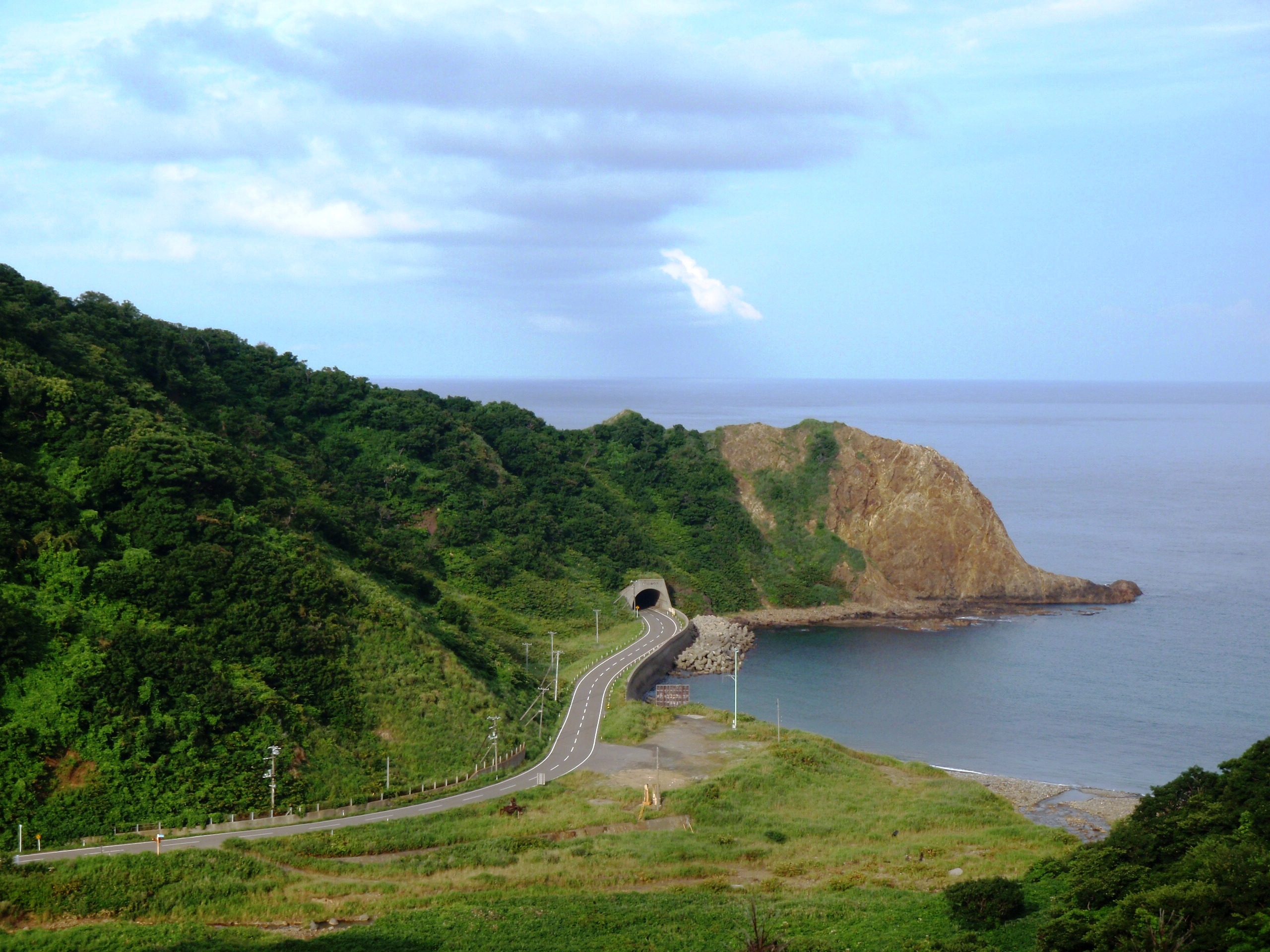
Okushiri Island, 2011.

Okushiri Island (奥尻島, Okushiri-tō) is an island in Hokkaidō, Japan. It has an area of 142.97 square kilometres (55.20 sq mi). The town of Okushiri and the Hiyama Prefectural Natural Park encompass the entire island. It has many pastures, beech tree forests, and a rocky coastline. There are two elementary schools, one junior high school, and one senior high school. Okushiri currently has no colleges or universities.

== Etymology ==
The name Okushiri comes from the Ainu name I-kus-un-sir (イクㇱウンシㇼ). The phonetic word ikus(un) means other side and sir means island. However, the Japanese meaning of the two kanji used for the name mean "deep inside/innermost" and "buttocks/hips".

== Geography ==
Okushiri Island is located roughly 20 kilometers (12 miles) west of mainland Hokkaido. It is oval in shape with a coastline of 84 kilometers (52.2 miles). The island spans 27 kilometers (16.8 miles) from north to south, and 11 kilometers (6.8 miles) from east to west. Mount Kamui is the island's highest peak, and reaches 584 meters (1,916 feet).

=== Climate ===
Climate data for Okushiri, 1991–2020 normals, extremes 1976–present
Month	Jan	Feb	Mar	Apr	May	Jun	Jul	Aug	Sep	Oct	Nov	Dec	Year
Record high °C (°F)	9.6 (49.3)	12.9 (55.2)	14.5 (58.1)	21.5 (70.7)	23.1 (73.6)	26.4 (79.5)	31.2 (88.2)	33.2 (91.8)	30.9 (87.6)	23.8 (74.8)	19.0 (66.2)	14.6 (58.3)	33.2 (91.8)
Mean maximum °C (°F)	6.7 (44.1)	7.6 (45.7)	11.4 (52.5)	16.3 (61.3)	20.3 (68.5)	23.6 (74.5)	27.2 (81.0)	28.8 (83.8)	26.8 (80.2)	21.3 (70.3)	16.8 (62.2)	10.5 (50.9)	29.3 (84.7)
Mean daily maximum °C (°F)	1.6 (34.9)	1.9 (35.4)	5.3 (41.5)	10.0 (50.0)	14.6 (58.3)	19.0 (66.2)	22.9 (73.2)	25.4 (77.7)	22.6 (72.7)	16.6 (61.9)	10.0 (50.0)	3.9 (39.0)	12.8 (55.0)
Daily mean °C (°F)	−0.4 (31.3)	−0.2 (31.6)	3.0 (37.4)	7.4 (45.3)	11.7 (53.1)	16.0 (60.8)	20.1 (68.2)	22.5 (72.5)	20.0 (68.0)	14.2 (57.6)	7.6 (45.7)	1.7 (35.1)	10.3 (50.5)
Mean daily minimum °C (°F)	−2.4 (27.7)	−2.2 (28.0)	0.7 (33.3)	5.0 (41.0)	9.3 (48.7)	13.6 (56.5)	17.9 (64.2)	20.1 (68.2)	17.5 (63.5)	11.8 (53.2)	5.1 (41.2)	−0.5 (31.1)	8.0 (46.4)
Mean minimum °C (°F)	−7.5 (18.5)	−7.5 (18.5)	−4.5 (23.9)	0.5 (32.9)	4.9 (40.8)	9.4 (48.9)	14.0 (57.2)	16.4 (61.5)	12.5 (54.5)	5.4 (41.7)	−2.1 (28.2)	−6.4 (20.5)	−8.6 (16.5)
Record low °C (°F)	−12.7 (9.1)	−13.4 (7.9)	−10.4 (13.3)	−4.6 (23.7)	0.2 (32.4)	5.0 (41.0)	8.9 (48.0)	12.1 (53.8)	6.6 (43.9)	−0.2 (31.6)	−7.6 (18.3)	−13.2 (8.2)	−13.4 (7.9)
Average precipitation mm (inches)	29.6 (1.17)	34.1 (1.34)	42.4 (1.67)	64.2 (2.53)	83.8 (3.30)	76.3 (3.00)	113.3 (4.46)	127.1 (5.00)	122.7 (4.83)	90.4 (3.56)	84.2 (3.31)	61.9 (2.44)	920.1 (36.22)
Average precipitation days (≥ 1.0 mm)	6.3	5.4	6.6	7.7	8.4	7.3	8.7	8.1	9.5	11.0	11.1	9.2	98.6
Mean monthly sunshine hours	45.2	71.3	158.2	207.9	196.2	178.4	154.3	199.1	189.1	160.6	87.0	46.3	1,698.2
Source 1: JMA
Source 2: JMA

== Communities ==
Two main towns, Aonae at the southern tip and Okushiri in the central-eastern portion, contain the majority of the island's population and infrastructure. Additional small communities and individual households are found near the coast, and are connected by a road that circumnavigates the island.

== History ==
Okushiri has been struck by several natural disasters, including the 1983 Sea of Japan earthquake on 26 May 1983 which killed two, and the more deadly 1993 Hokkaidō earthquake and tsunami on 12 July 1993. The 1993 earthquake had a magnitude of 7.7 on the moment magnitude scale and a maximum felt intensity of VIII (Severe) on the Mercalli intensity scale. It triggered a major tsunami that caused deaths on Hokkaidō and in southeastern Russia, with a total of 230 fatalities recorded. Okushiri Island was the hardest hit, with 198 casualties from the earthquake, tsunami and a large landslide. The tsunami inundated large parts of Okushiri, despite its tsunami defenses. The island subsided by 5–80 centimetres (2.0–31.5 in). After the tsunami, the number of residents slowly declined, and continues to do so.

== Transportation ==
Okushiri Airport serves the island with daily flights to and from Hakodate Airport. Regular ferry services to and from Esashi (2 hours and 20 minutes) and Setana (1 hour and 40 minutes) are provided by Heartland Ferry, and time timetable changes seasonally.

A local bus service operates year-round.

== Tourist activities ==
Okushiri Island is known for Nabetsuru Rock, which translates to "pot-handle rock," a small rock arch sitting offshore of Okushiri Town. Okushiri Island has one operating hot spring, and opportunities for fishing and swimming. The Okushiri Moonlight Marathon was started in 2013, and is the largest attraction on Okushiri Island for visitors, attracting runners from around Japan and some foreign countries. The race starts at 3 pm and often finishes as it is getting dark. Local villagers turn out in large numbers to cheer on the runners. At the finish line, the race concludes with a seafood banquet and awards ceremony.
