= Okushiri, Hokkaido =

Okushiri 奥尻町
- Town
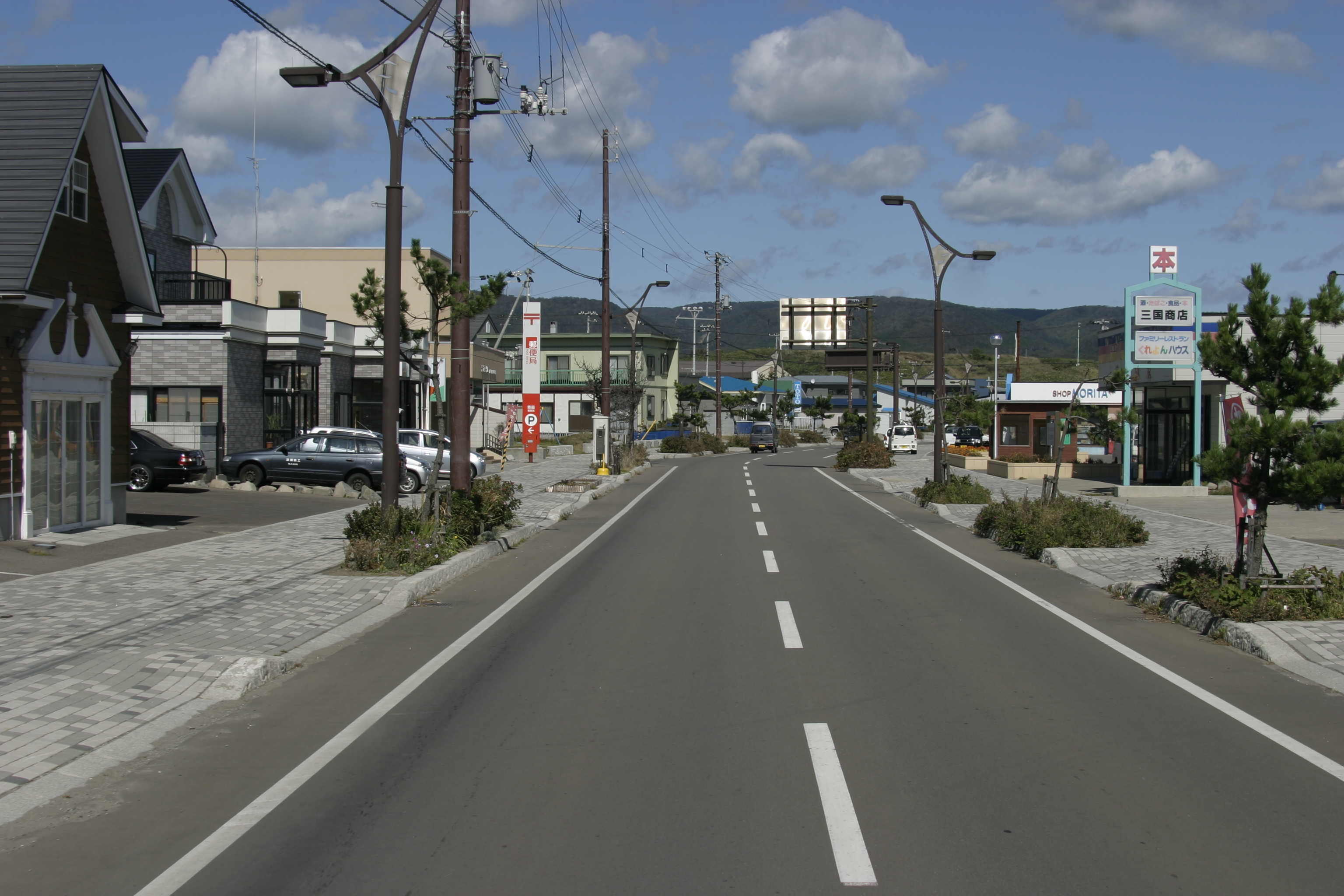

- Flag Chapter

- Location of Okushiri in Hokkaido (Hiyama Subprefecture)

- Location in Japan
- Coordinates: 42°10′N 139°31′E
- Country: Japan
- Region: Hokkaido
- Prefecture: Hokkaido (Hiyama Subprefecture)
- District: Okushiri District, Hokkaido

Government
  - Mayor: Takumi Shimmura

Area
  - Total: 142.98 km^{2} (55.20 sq mi)

Population (30 September 2016)
  - Total: 2,812
  - Density: 19.67/km^{2} (50.94/sq mi)
- Time zone: UTC+09:00 (JST)
- City hall address: 806 Okushiri, Okushiri-chō, Okushiri-gun, Hokkaidō; 043-1498
- Climate: Cfa
- Website: www.town.okushiri.lg.jp
- Symbols
- Flower: Rugosa rose
- Tree: Japanese yew

Okushiri (奥尻町, Okushiri-chō) is a town on Okushiri Island, located in Hiyama Subprefecture, Hokkaido, Japan.

== Etymology ==
The name Okushiri comes from the Ainu name Ikusyun-shiri. Iku means other side and shiri means island. However, the Japanese meaning of the two kanji used for the name mean "deep inside/innermost" and "buttocks/hips".

== Geography ==
Hiyama Prefectural Natural Park encompasses the entire island and town.

== Population ==
As of September 2016, the town has an estimated population of 2,812, and a density of 20 persons per km^{2}. The total area is 142.98 km^{2}.

== History ==
On July 12, 1993, the Southwest Hokkaido Open Sea earthquake (北海道南西沖地震) of magnitude 7.8 in the Sea of Japan off southwest Hokkaido created a devastating tsunami. This tsunami killed 198 people in the town, despite a tsunami warning system and a seawall, and also caused landslides on the hills above. Another 32 people were missing, including 3 in Russia and 129 were injured. The subsequent fire burned down much of what remained. The island was reshaped by the tsunami, which was 10 meters high in town. The tsunami struck within five minutes of the earthquake, leaving residents absolutely no warning.

- 1906: The village of Okushiri was founded.
- 1966: Okushiri Village became Okushiri Town.
- 1993: Southwest Hokkaido Open Sea earthquake occurred.

== Climate ==
Okushiri has a humid continental climate (Köppen Dfa) closely bordering on a humid subtropical climate (Cfa). The average annual temperature in Okushiri is 10.3 °C (50.5 °F). The average annual rainfall is 920.1 mm (36.22 in) with August as the wettest month. The temperatures are highest on average in August, at around 22.5 °C (72.5 °F), and lowest in January, at around −0.4 °C (31.3 °F). The highest temperature ever recorded in Okushiri was 33.2 °C (91.8 °F) on 10 August 1999; the coldest temperature ever recorded was −13.4 °C (7.9 °F) on 2 February 1996.

Climate data for Okushiri, 1991–2020 normals, extremes 1976–present
Month	Jan	Feb	Mar	Apr	May	Jun	Jul	Aug	Sep	Oct	Nov	Dec	Year
Record high °C (°F)	9.6 (49.3)	12.9 (55.2)	14.5 (58.1)	21.5 (70.7)	23.1 (73.6)	26.4 (79.5)	31.2 (88.2)	33.2 (91.8)	30.9 (87.6)	23.8 (74.8)	19.0 (66.2)	14.6 (58.3)	33.2 (91.8)
Mean maximum °C (°F)	6.7 (44.1)	7.6 (45.7)	11.4 (52.5)	16.3 (61.3)	20.3 (68.5)	23.6 (74.5)	27.2 (81.0)	28.8 (83.8)	26.8 (80.2)	21.3 (70.3)	16.8 (62.2)	10.5 (50.9)	29.3 (84.7)
Mean daily maximum °C (°F)	1.6 (34.9)	1.9 (35.4)	5.3 (41.5)	10.0 (50.0)	14.6 (58.3)	19.0 (66.2)	22.9 (73.2)	25.4 (77.7)	22.6 (72.7)	16.6 (61.9)	10.0 (50.0)	3.9 (39.0)	12.8 (55.0)
Daily mean °C (°F)	−0.4 (31.3)	−0.2 (31.6)	3.0 (37.4)	7.4 (45.3)	11.7 (53.1)	16.0 (60.8)	20.1 (68.2)	22.5 (72.5)	20.0 (68.0)	14.2 (57.6)	7.6 (45.7)	1.7 (35.1)	10.3 (50.5)
Mean daily minimum °C (°F)	−2.4 (27.7)	−2.2 (28.0)	0.7 (33.3)	5.0 (41.0)	9.3 (48.7)	13.6 (56.5)	17.9 (64.2)	20.1 (68.2)	17.5 (63.5)	11.8 (53.2)	5.1 (41.2)	−0.5 (31.1)	8.0 (46.4)
Mean minimum °C (°F)	−7.5 (18.5)	−7.5 (18.5)	−4.5 (23.9)	0.5 (32.9)	4.9 (40.8)	9.4 (48.9)	14.0 (57.2)	16.4 (61.5)	12.5 (54.5)	5.4 (41.7)	−2.1 (28.2)	−6.4 (20.5)	−8.6 (16.5)
Record low °C (°F)	−12.7 (9.1)	−13.4 (7.9)	−10.4 (13.3)	−4.6 (23.7)	0.2 (32.4)	5.0 (41.0)	8.9 (48.0)	12.1 (53.8)	6.6 (43.9)	−0.2 (31.6)	−7.6 (18.3)	−13.2 (8.2)	−13.4 (7.9)
Average precipitation mm (inches)	29.6 (1.17)	34.1 (1.34)	42.4 (1.67)	64.2 (2.53)	83.8 (3.30)	76.3 (3.00)	113.3 (4.46)	127.1 (5.00)	122.7 (4.83)	90.4 (3.56)	84.2 (3.31)	61.9 (2.44)	920.1 (36.22)
Average precipitation days (≥ 1.0 mm)	6.3	5.4	6.6	7.7	8.4	7.3	8.7	8.1	9.5	11.0	11.1	9.2	98.6
Mean monthly sunshine hours	45.2	71.3	158.2	207.9	196.2	178.4	154.3	199.1	189.1	160.6	87.0	46.3	1,698.2
Source 1: JMA
Source 2: JMA

Climate data for Okushiri Airport (2003–2020 normals, extremes 2003–present)
Month	Jan	Feb	Mar	Apr	May	Jun	Jul	Aug	Sep	Oct	Nov	Dec	Year
Record high °C (°F)	9.3 (48.7)	11.1 (52.0)	12.6 (54.7)	22.4 (72.3)	24.3 (75.7)	26.7 (80.1)	31.1 (88.0)	32.7 (90.9)	30.2 (86.4)	23.6 (74.5)	18.5 (65.3)	14.0 (57.2)	32.7 (90.9)
Mean daily maximum °C (°F)	0.7 (33.3)	1.4 (34.5)	5.1 (41.2)	9.8 (49.6)	14.4 (57.9)	18.7 (65.7)	22.4 (72.3)	25.1 (77.2)	22.4 (72.3)	16.4 (61.5)	9.7 (49.5)	3.3 (37.9)	12.5 (54.4)
Daily mean °C (°F)	−1.6 (29.1)	−1.0 (30.2)	2.3 (36.1)	6.8 (44.2)	11.3 (52.3)	15.8 (60.4)	19.8 (67.6)	22.2 (72.0)	19.4 (66.9)	13.5 (56.3)	7.0 (44.6)	0.8 (33.4)	9.7 (49.4)
Mean daily minimum °C (°F)	−3.9 (25.0)	−3.5 (25.7)	−0.5 (31.1)	3.6 (38.5)	8.2 (46.8)	13.1 (55.6)	17.5 (63.5)	19.6 (67.3)	16.2 (61.2)	10.1 (50.2)	3.9 (39.0)	−1.8 (28.8)	6.9 (44.4)
Record low °C (°F)	−11.1 (12.0)	−13.0 (8.6)	−7.7 (18.1)	−2.4 (27.7)	0.5 (32.9)	5.7 (42.3)	10.4 (50.7)	11.0 (51.8)	7.5 (45.5)	2.4 (36.3)	−5.9 (21.4)	−10.9 (12.4)	−13.0 (8.6)
Average precipitation mm (inches)	31.3 (1.23)	30.9 (1.22)	40.3 (1.59)	53.0 (2.09)	87.4 (3.44)	82.7 (3.26)	108.4 (4.27)	112.0 (4.41)	113.8 (4.48)	76.8 (3.02)	74.1 (2.92)	57.7 (2.27)	868.2 (34.18)
Average precipitation days (≥ 1.0 mm)	8.6	6.9	7.6	7.1	8.7	8.2	8.9	7.1	9.3	10.1	11.6	10.1	104.2
Source: Japan Meteorological Agency

== Transportation ==
Okushiri Island is accessible by air or sea. Okushiri Airport serves the island with daily flights to and from Hakodate Airport. Regular ferry services to and from Esashi (2 hours and 20 minutes) and Setana (1 hour and 40 minutes) are provided by Heartland Ferry, and time timetable changes seasonally.

A local bus service operates year-round.

== Education ==
- High schools
  - Hokkaido Okushiri High School
- Junior high schools
  - Aonae Junior High School (closed in 2017 to merge with Okushiri Junior High School)
  - Okushiri Junior High School
- Elementary schools
  - Aonae Elementary School
  - Okushiri Elementary School

== Sister city ==
- (Hyōgo Prefecture) Awaji, Hyogo
