= Kamui Tips =

Logo of Kamui Tips.

Kamui Tips is a Japanese manufacturer of cue tips for billiards and pool. According to the company, the tips are produced by founder Masato Hiraoka in his workshop in Hiroshima. The company and its products are named after the mythological Kamuy.

== Background ==
Kamui tips first gained international exposure in October 2007, when they were introduced at the BCA Super Billiards Expo in the United States. They were endorsed in 2008 by top pro Mika Immonen as his tip of choice while winning the U.S. Open 9-Ball Championships two years in a row, followed by the title of Inside Pool Magazine's 2009 Player of the Year.

The tips are made primarily from pig leather, and consist of many layers that are laminated and tempered for a rubber-like consistency. Kamui's process is so specific that some of their products have been in development for more than nine years before they hit store shelves. Currently, Kamui Tips produces two styles of tips: "Kamui Black" and "Kamui". "Kamui Black" tips come in four degrees of hardness: super soft, soft, medium and hard. "Kamui" tips come in four different hardnesses: soft, medium soft, medium and hard.

== See also ==
- List of sporting goods manufacturers
