= Sea of Japan =

Marginal sea between Japan, Russia and Korea

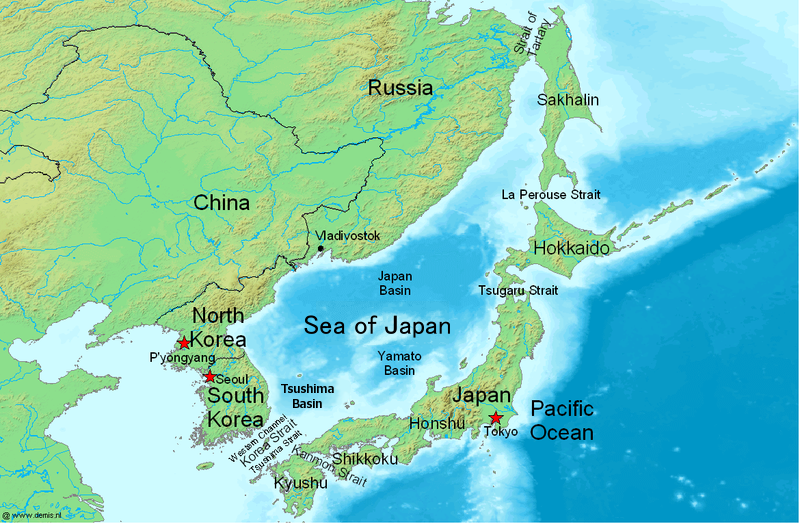
- Sea of Japan map

Chinese name
- Chinese: 日本海
Transcriptions
Standard Mandarin
- Hanyu Pinyin: Rìběn Hǎi

Japanese name
- Kanji: 日本海
- Hiragana: にほんかい
Transcriptions
- Revised Hepburn: Nihon-kai

North Korean name
- Chosŏn'gŭl: 조선동해
- Hancha: 朝鮮東海
- Literal meaning: East Sea of Korea
Transcriptions
- Revised Romanization: Joseon Donghae
- McCune–Reischauer: Chosŏn Tonghae

South Korean name
- Hangul: 동해
- Hanja: 東海
- Literal meaning: East Sea
Transcriptions
- Revised Romanization: Donghae
- McCune–Reischauer: Tonghae

Russian name
- Russian: Японское море
- Romanization: Yaponskoye more

Manchu name
- Manchu: ᡩᡝᡵᡤᡳ ᠮᡝᡩᡝᡵᡳ dergi mederi

The Sea of Japan is the marginal sea between the Japanese archipelago, Sakhalin, the Korean Peninsula, and the mainland of the Russian Far East. The Japanese archipelago separates the sea from the Pacific Ocean. Like the Mediterranean Sea, it has almost no tides due to its nearly complete enclosure from the Pacific Ocean. This isolation also affects faunal diversity and salinity, both of which are lower than in the open ocean. The sea has no large islands, bays or capes. Its water balance is mostly determined by the inflow and outflow through the straits connecting it to the neighboring seas and the Pacific Ocean. Few rivers discharge into the sea and their total contribution to the water exchange is within 1%.

The seawater has an elevated concentration of dissolved oxygen that results in high biological productivity. Therefore, fishing is the dominant economic activity in the region. The intensity of shipments across the sea has been moderate owing to political issues, but it is steadily increasing as a result of the growth of East Asian economies.

== Names ==
Sea of Japan is the dominant term used in English for the sea. The sea is called Nihonkai (日本海; Japanese pronunciation: [ɲ̟ì.hó̞ŋ̀.kä̀ì]; lit. 'Japan Sea') in Japan, Rìběn hǎi (日本海, transl. Japan Sea) or originally Jīng hǎi (鲸海, transl. Whale Sea) in China, Yaponskoye more (Японское море, transl. Japanese Sea) in Russia, Chosŏn Tonghae (조선동해, transl. Korean East Sea) in North Korea, and Donghae (동해, transl. East Sea) in South Korea.

=== Naming dispute ===
The naming of the sea is the subject of an ongoing dispute between Japan, North Korea, and South Korea. Japan uses the name Sea of Japan and asserts that it has been the internationally accepted term since the early 19th century. In contrast, South Korea contends that the East Sea was historically used before Japanese colonial rule, and officially requests that it be used alongside Sea of Japan. North Korea advocates for the name East Sea of Korea.

Limits of Oceans and Seas (S-23), published by the International Hydrographic Organization (IHO), had been using the name Japan Sea since it was first published in 1928. It has not been updated since 1953 and is not able to effectively serve as an international standard in today's digital environment. In 2020, the IHO decided to develop a new digital standard, S-130, to meet modern Geographic Information System (GIS) requirements and replace the geographic names in S-23 with unique identifiers for each maritime area in S-130. The IHO Secretary-General stated that S-23, the previous version of the nautical chart made in 1953 will be kept publicly available simply to demonstrate the evolutionary process from the analogue to the digital era. S-130 was formally adopted at the fourth session of the IHO Assembly, held in Monaco from 19 to 23 April 2026. According to the IHO, the standard provides unique numerical identifiers for oceans and seas instead of names, and enables countries to use their name of choice in their own national products and services, and it is expected that IHO charts will no longer bear traditional names like Japan Sea. The South Korean Ministry of Foreign Affairs stated that the adoption reflected the country's efforts to challenge the exclusive use of the name Sea of Japan.

== History ==
For centuries, the sea had protected Japan from land invasions, particularly by the Mongols. It had long been navigated by Asian and, from the 18th century, by European ships. Russian expeditions of 1733–1743 mapped Sakhalin and the Japanese islands. In the 1780s, the Frenchman Jean-François de Galaup, comte de Lapérouse, traveled northward across the sea through the strait later named after him. In 1796, a British naval officer, William Robert Broughton, explored the Strait of Tartary, the eastern coast of the Russian Far East and the Korean Peninsula.

In 1803–1806, the Russian navigator Adam Johann von Krusenstern while sailing across the globe in the ship Nadezhda also explored, in passing, the Sea of Japan and the eastern shores of Japanese islands. In 1849, another Russian explorer Gennady Nevelskoy discovered the strait between the continent and Sakhalin and mapped the northern part of the Strait of Tartary. Russian expeditions were made in 1853–1854 and 1886–1889 to measure the surface temperatures and record the tides. They also documented the cyclonal character of the sea currents.

Other notable expeditions of the 19th century include the American North Pacific Exploring and Surveying Expedition (1853–1856) and British Challenger expedition (1872–1876). The aquatic life was described by V. K. Brazhnikov in 1899–1902 and P. Yu. Schmidt in 1903–1904. The Japanese scientific studies of the sea began only in 1915 and became systematic since the 1920s.

American, Canadian and French whaleships cruised for whales in the sea between 1847 and 1892. Most entered the sea via Korea Strait and left via La Pérouse Strait, but some entered and exited via Tsugaru Strait. They primarily targeted right whales, but began catching humpbacks as right whale catches declined. They also made attempts to catch blue and fin whales, but these species invariably sank after being killed. Right whales were caught from March to September, with peak catches in May and June. During the peak years of 1848 and 1849 a total of over 170 vessels (over 60 in 1848, and over 110 in 1849) cruised in the Sea of Japan, with significantly lesser numbers in following years.

== Geography and geology ==
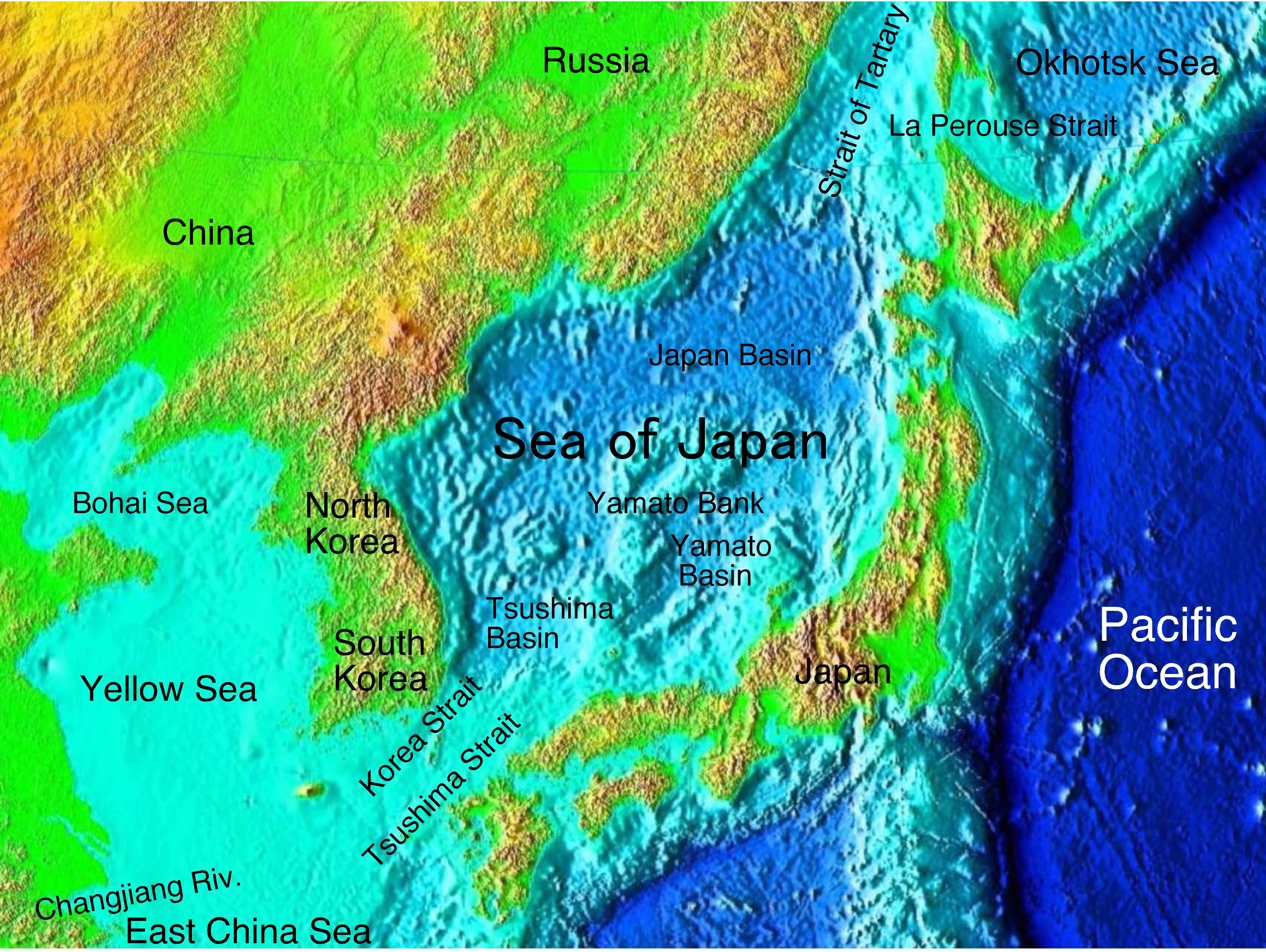
Relief of the Sea of Japan and nearby areas

Map showing Japanese archipelago, Sea of Japan and surrounding part of continental East Asia in Early Miocene (23–18 Ma)

Map showing Japanese archipelago, Sea of Japan and surrounding part of continental East Asia in Middle Pliocene to Late Pliocene (3.5–2 Ma)

The Sea of Japan was landlocked when the land bridge of East Asia existed. The Japan Arc started to form in the Early Miocene. In the Early Miocene the Japan Sea started to open, and the northern and southern parts of the Japanese archipelago separated from each other. During the Miocene, the Sea of Japan expanded.

The north part of the Japanese archipelago was further fragmented later until orogenesis of the north-eastern Japanese archipelago began in the later Late Miocene. The south part of the Japanese archipelago remained as a relatively large landmass. The land area had expanded northward in the Late Miocene. The orogenesis of high mountain ranges in north-eastern Japan started in Late Miocene and lasted in Pliocene also. The eastern margin of the sea may host an incipient subduction zone responsible for large earthquakes in 1940, 1964, 1983 and 1993.

Nowadays the Sea of Japan is bounded by the Russian mainland and Sakhalin island to the north, the Korean Peninsula to the west, and the Japanese islands of Hokkaidō, Honshū and Kyūshū to the east and south. It is connected to other seas by five straits: the Strait of Tartary between the Asian mainland and Sakhalin; La Pérouse Strait between Sakhalin and Hokkaidō; the Tsugaru Strait between Hokkaidō and Honshū; the Kanmon Straits between Honshū and Kyūshū; and the Korea Strait between the Korean Peninsula and Kyūshū.

The Korea Strait is composed of the Western Channel and the Tsushima Strait, on either side of Tsushima Island. The straits were formed in recent geologic periods. The oldest of them are the Tsugaru and Tsushima straits. Their formation had interrupted the migration of elephants into the Japanese islands at the end of the Neogene Period (about 2.6 million years ago). The most recent is La Perouse Strait, which formed about 60,000 to 11,000 years ago closing the path used by mammoths which had earlier moved to northern Hokkaidō. All the straits are rather shallow, with a minimal depth of the order of 100 meters or less. This hinders water exchange, thereby isolating the water and aquatic life of the Sea of Japan from the neighboring seas and oceans.

The sea has a surface area of about 1,050,000 km^{2} (410,000 sq mi), a mean depth of 1,752 m (5,748 ft) and a maximum depth of 4,568 m (14,987 ft). It has a carrot-like shape, with the major axis extending from south-west to north-east and a wide southern part narrowing toward the north. The coastal length is about 7,600 km (4,700 mi) with the largest part (3,240 km or 2,010 mi) belonging to Russia. The sea extends from north to south for more than 2,255 km (1,401 mi) and has a maximum width of about 1,070 km (660 mi).

It has three major basins: the Yamato Basin in the south-east, the Japan Basin in the north and the Tsushima Basin (Ulleung Basin) in the south-west. The Japan Basin is of oceanic origin and is the deepest part of the sea, whereas the Tsushima Basin is the shallowest with the depths below 2,300 m (7,500 ft). On the eastern shores, the continental shelves of the sea are wide, but on the western shores, particularly along the Korean coast, they are narrow, averaging about 30 km (19 mi).

There are three distinct continental shelves in the northern part (above 44° N). They form a staircase-like structure with the steps slightly inclined southwards and submerged to the depths of 900–1,400 (3,000–4,600), 1,700–2,000 (5,600–6,600) and 2,300–2,600 m (7,500–8,500 ft). The last step sharply drops to the depths of about 3,500 m (11,500 ft) toward the central (deepest) part of the sea. The bottom of this part is relatively flat, but has a few plateaus. In addition, an underwater ridge rising up to 3,500 m (11,500 ft) runs from north to south through the middle of the central part.

The Japanese coastal area of the sea consists of Okujiri Ridge, Sado Ridge, Hakusan Banks, Wakasa Ridge and Oki Ridge. Yamato Ridge is of continental origin and is composed of granite, rhyolite, andesite and basalt. It has an uneven bottom covered with boulders of volcanic rock. Most other areas of the sea are of oceanic origin. Seabed down to 300 m (980 ft) is of continental nature and is covered with a mixture of mud, sand, gravel and fragments of rock. The depths between 300 and 800 m (980 and 2,620 ft) are covered in hemipelagic sediments (i.e., of semi-oceanic origin); these sediments are composed of blue mud rich in organic matter. Pelagic sediments of red mud dominate the deeper regions.

There are no large islands in the sea. Most of the smaller ones are near the eastern coast, except for Ulleungdo (South Korea). The most significant islands are Moneron, Rebun, Rishiri, Okushiri, Ōshima, Sado, Okinoshima, Ulleungdo, Askold, Russky and Putyatin. The shorelines are relatively straight and lack large bays and capes; the coastal shapes are simplest in Sakhalin and are more winding in the Japanese islands.

The largest bays are Peter the Great Gulf, Sovetskaya Gavan; Vladimira Bay, Olga; Posyet Bay in Russia; East Korea Bay in North Korea; and Ishikari (Hokkaidō), Toyama (Honshū), and Wakasa (Honshū) Bays in Japan. Prominent capes include Lazareva, Peschanyi (sandy), Povorotny, Gromova, Pogibi, Tyk, and Korsakova in Russia; Crillon on Sakhalin; Sōya, Nosappu, Tappi, Nyuda, Rebun, Rishiri, Okushiri, Daso and Oki in Japan; and Musu Dan in North Korea.

As world sea level dropped during the ice cap advances of the last Ice Age, the exit straits of the Sea of Japan one by one dried and closed. There is controversy as to whether or not in each ice cap advance the world sea level fell low enough for the deepest, the western channel of the Korea Strait, to dry and close, turning the Sea of Japan into a huge cold inland lake with a surface layer of fresh water, freezing over in the winters.

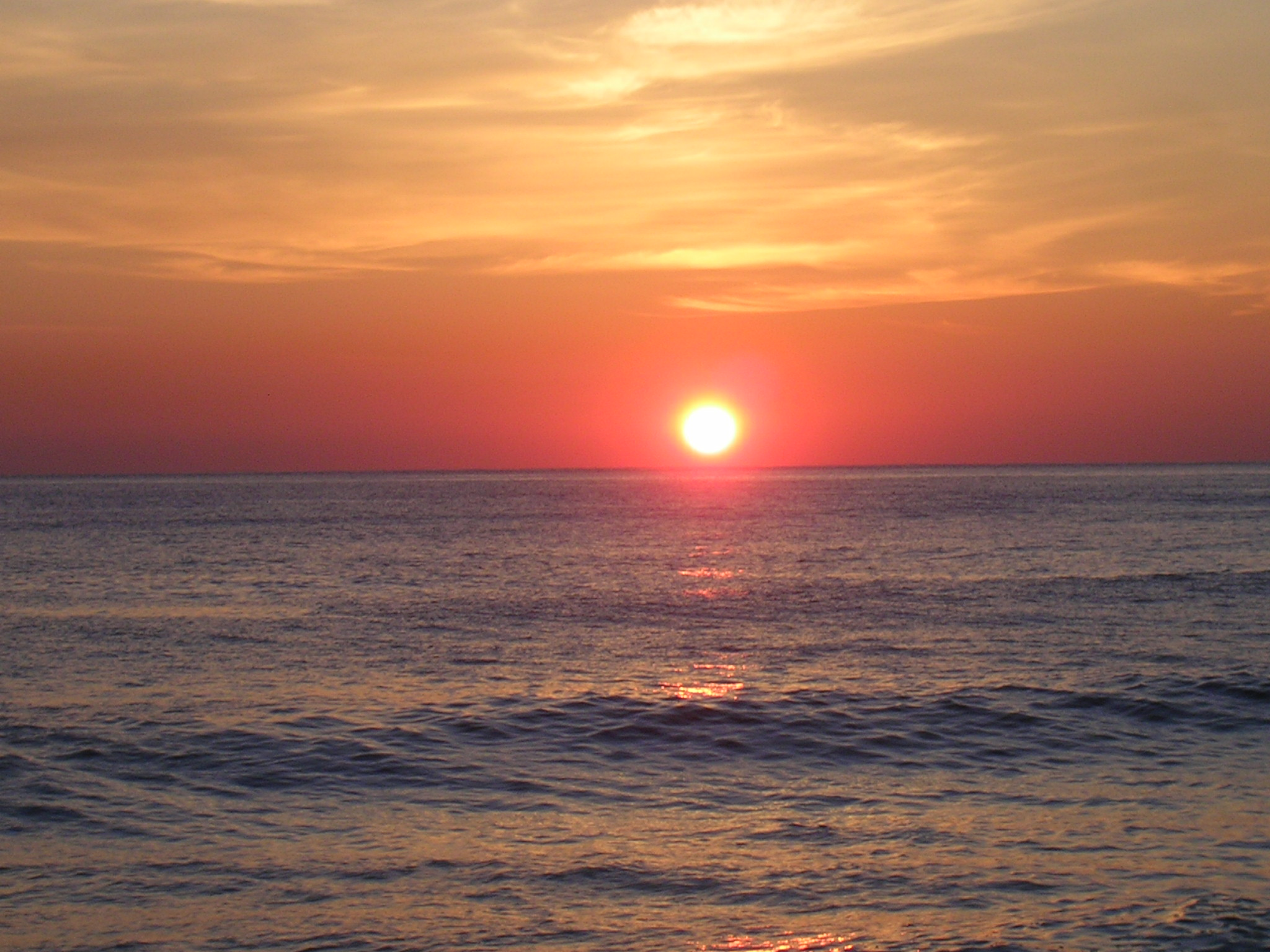
Sunrise over the Sea of Japan filmed in South Korea

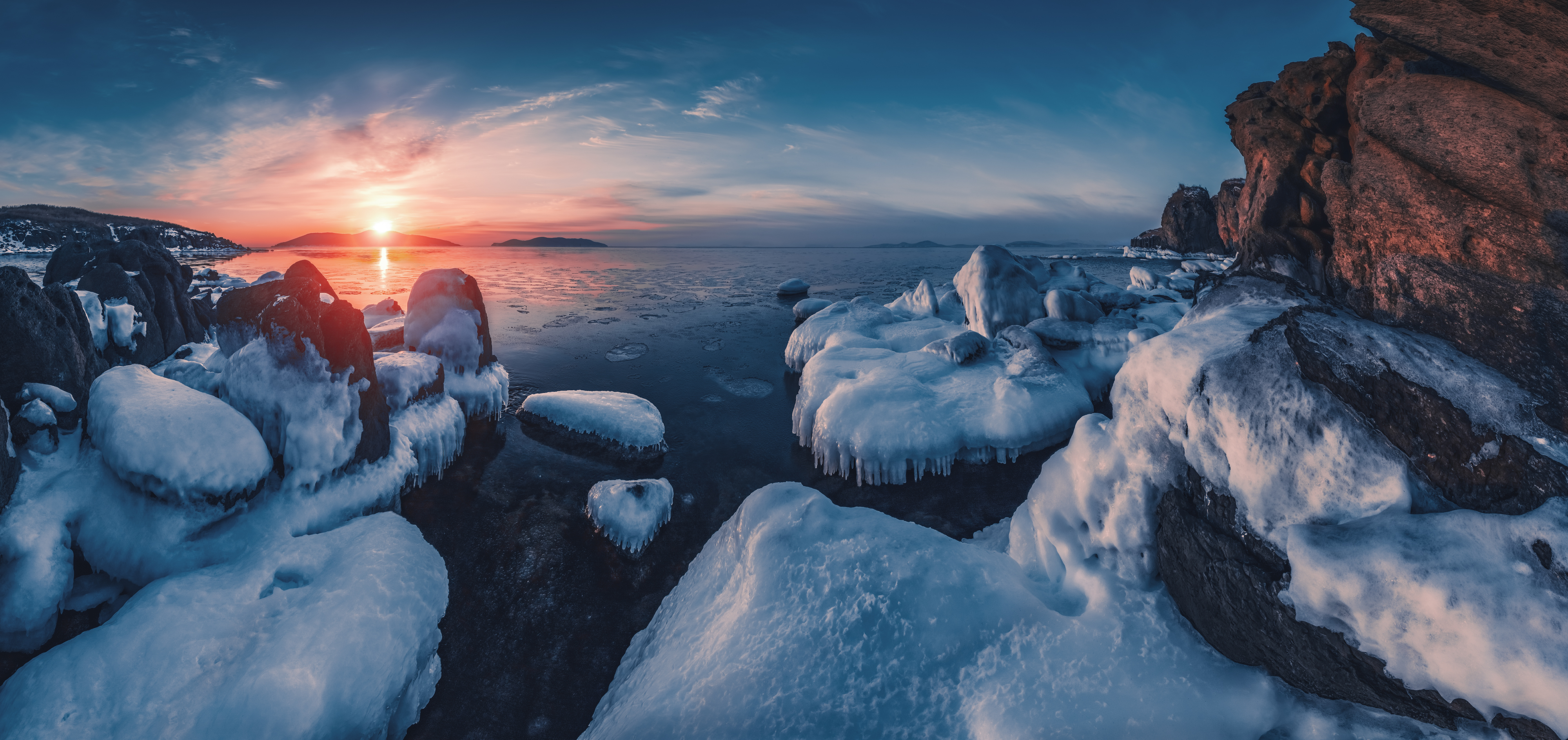
The Sea of Japan seen from the south of Slavyanka. From a distance, the two islands of Antipenko (left) and Sibiryakov (right).

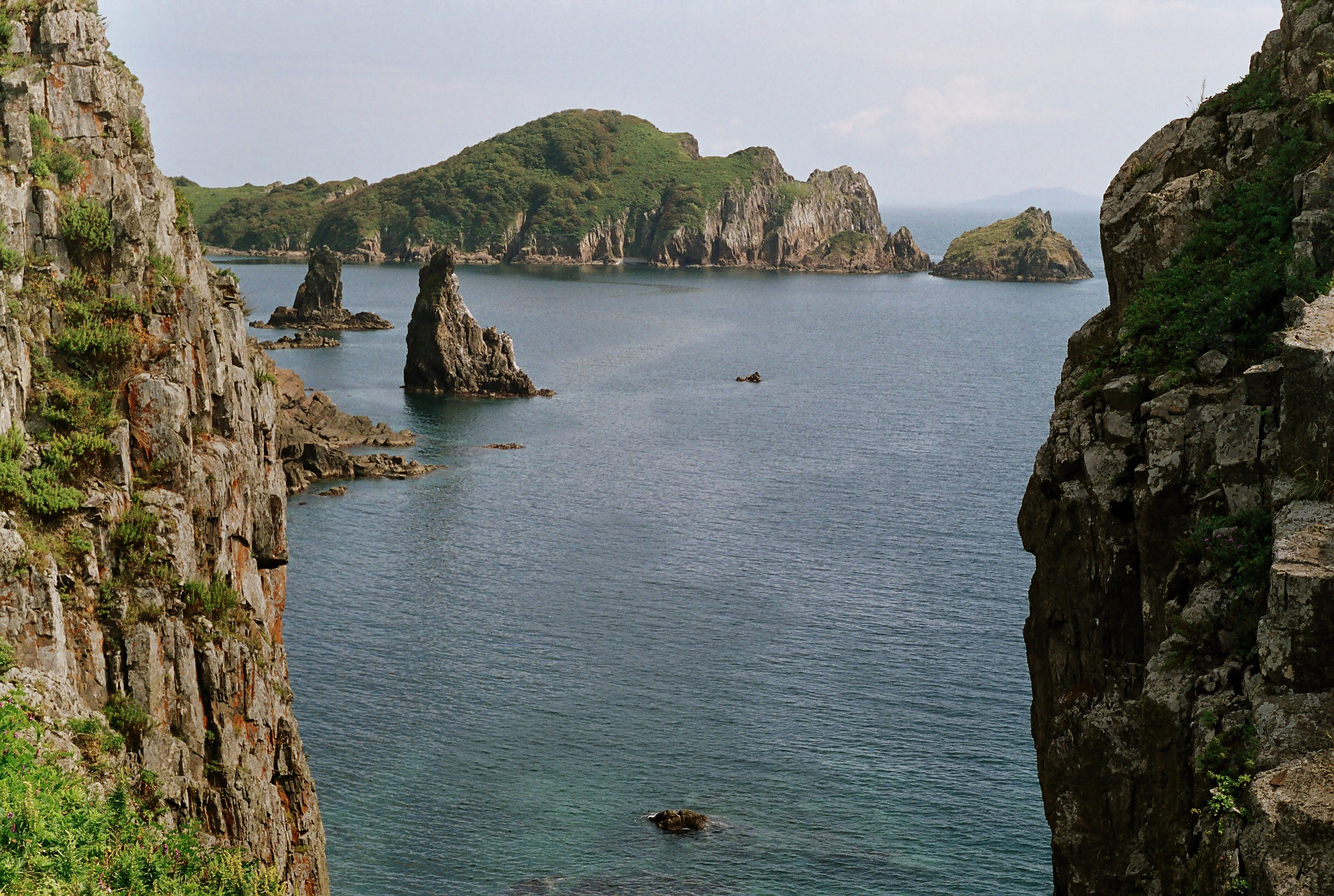
A bay at Sibiryakov Island, 50 km (31 mi) south from Vladivostok

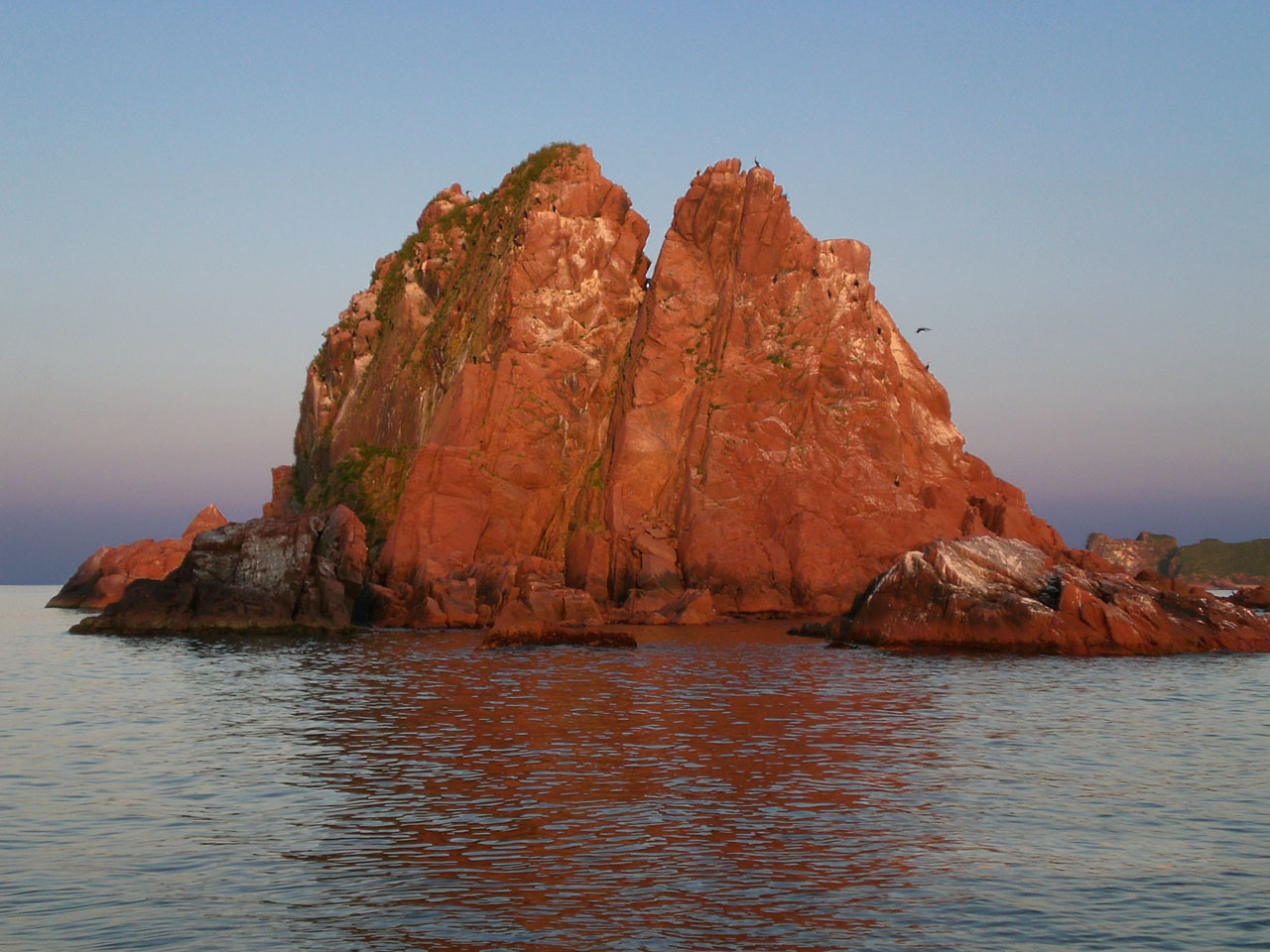
Sunset on Little Verkhovsky Islands near Vladivostok

== Climate ==
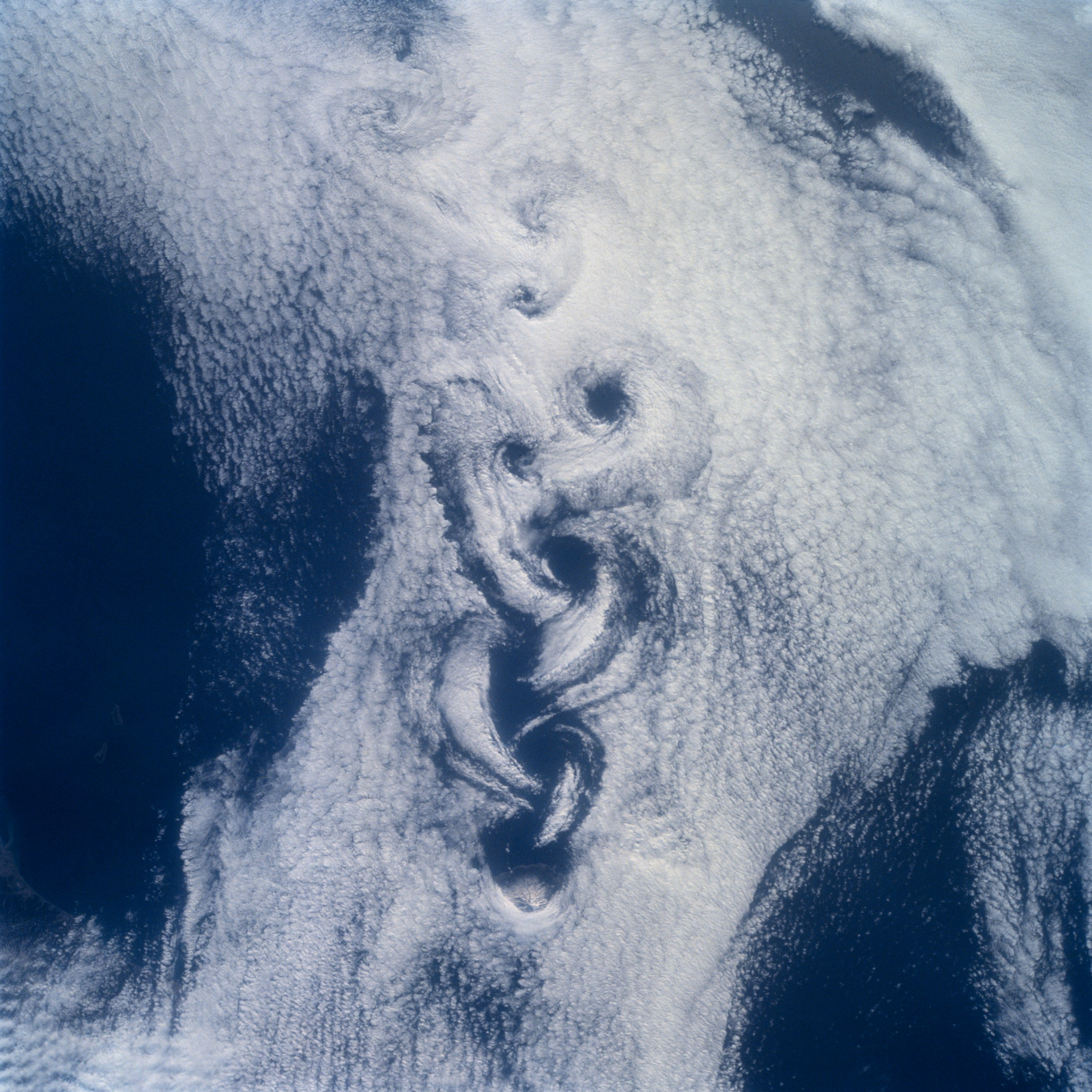
Von Kármán vortices off the coast of Rishiri Island

The sea climate has warm waters and monsoons. This combination results in strong evaporation, which is especially noticeable between October and March when the strong (12–15 m/s [39–49 ft/s] or higher) north-western monsoon wind brings cold and dry continental air. The evaporation is blown further south, causing snowfall in the mountainous western coasts of Japan. This winter monsoon brings typhoons and storms, with the waves reaching 8–10 m (26–33 ft) which erode the western coasts of Japan. Tsunami waves have also been recorded in the sea. In addition, the monsoon enhances the surface water convection, down to the depths of 30 m (98 ft).

The coldest months are January and February, with an average air temperature of −20 °C (−4 °F) in the north and 5 °C (41 °F) in the south. The northern one-quarter of the sea, particularly the Siberian coast and the Strait of Tartary, freezes for about 4−5 months. The timing and extent of freezing vary from year to year, so ice may start forming in the bays as early as October and its remains may be seen even in June. Ice cover is continuous only in the bays and forms floating patches in the open sea. Ice melting in spring results in cold currents in the northern areas.

In summer the wind weakens to 2–7 m/s (6.6–23.0 ft/s) and reverses its direction, blowing warm and humid air from the North Pacific onto the Asian mainland. The warmest month is August, with an average air temperature of 15 °C (59 °F) in the north and 25 °C (77 °F) in the south. Annual precipitation increases from 310–500 mm (12–20 in) in the north-west to 1,500–2,000 mm (59–79 in) in the south-east.

A peculiar turbulent cloud pattern, named von Kármán vortices, is sometimes observed over the Sea of Japan. It requires a stable field of low clouds driven by the wind over a small (isolated) and tall obstacle, and usually forms over small mountainous islands. The Sea of Japan meets these conditions as it has frequent winds and cloudy skies, as well as compact, tall islands such as Rishiri (1,721 m or 5,646 ft), Ulleungdo (984 m or 3,228 ft) and Ōshima (732 m or 2,402 ft).

== Extent ==
The International Hydrographic Organization defines the limits of the "Japan Sea" as follows:

On the Southwest. The Northeastern limit of the Eastern China Sea [From Cape Nomo (32°35′ N) in Kyushu to the South point of Fukuejima (Gotō Islands) and on through this island to Cape Ōse (Cape Goto) and to Cape Punam (푸남사키), the South point of Jeju Island (Quelpart), through this island to its Western extreme and thence along the parallel of 33°17′ North to the mainland] and the Western limit of the Seto Inland Sea [defined circuitously as "The Southeastern limit of the Japan Sea"].

On the Southeast. In Kanmon Straits. A line running from Cape Hachiman (八幡岬) (Note: Located in Kitakyushu, Fukuoka Prefecture) (130°49′,5 E) in Kyushu through the islands of Umashima and Mutsure Island (33°58′,5 N) to Murasaki no Hana (村崎ノ鼻) (Note: Located in Shimonoseki, Yamaguchi Prefecture) (34°01′ N) in Honshu.

On the East. In the Tsugaru Strait. From the extremity of Cape Shiriya (141°28′ E) to the extremity of Cape Esan (41°48′ N).

On the Northeast. In La Pérouse Strait (Sōya Kaikyō). A line joining Cape Sōya and Cape Crillon (45°55′ N).

On the North. From Cape Tuik (51°45′ N) to Cape Sushcheva.

== Hydrology ==
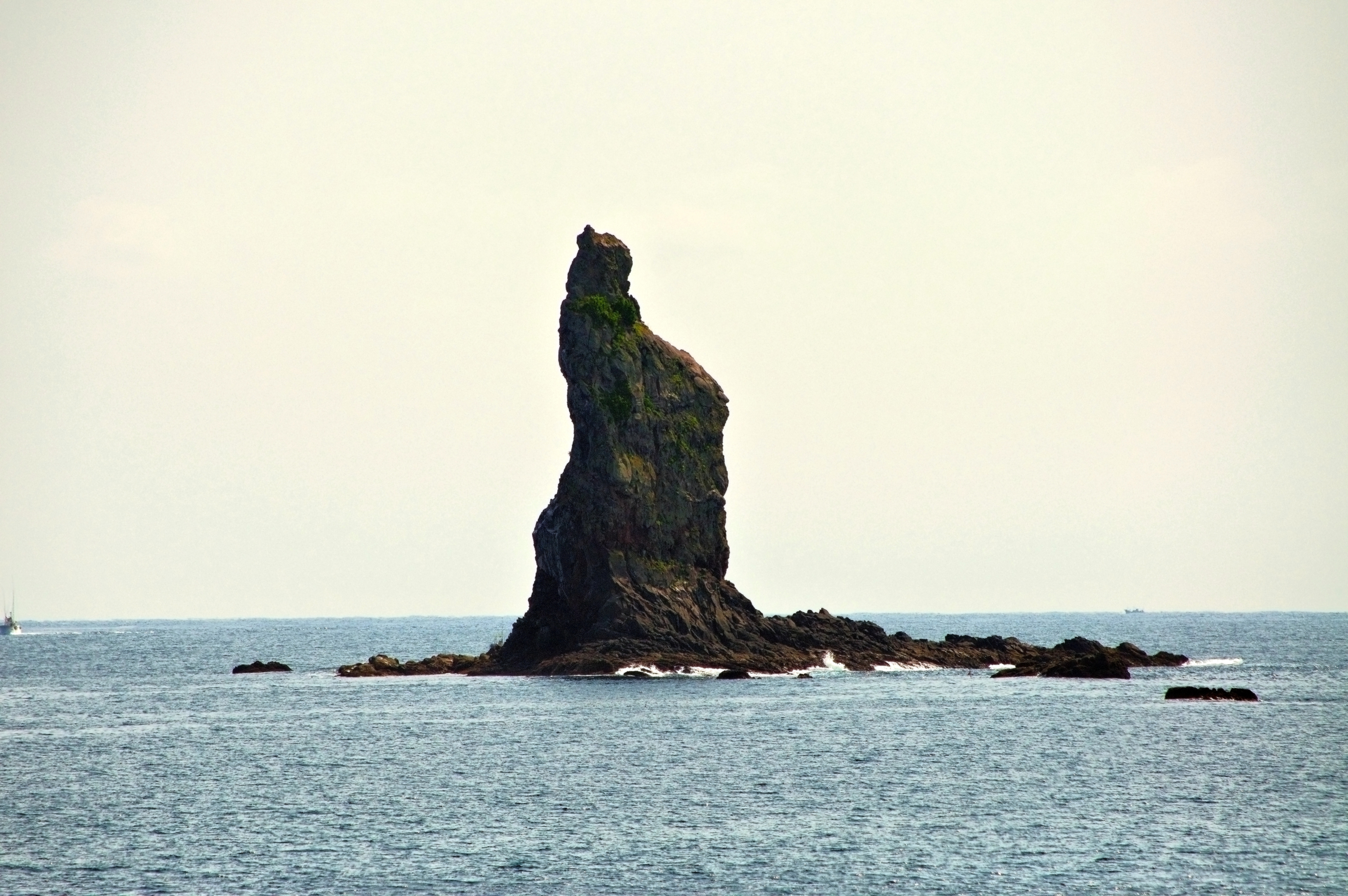
Tategami rock

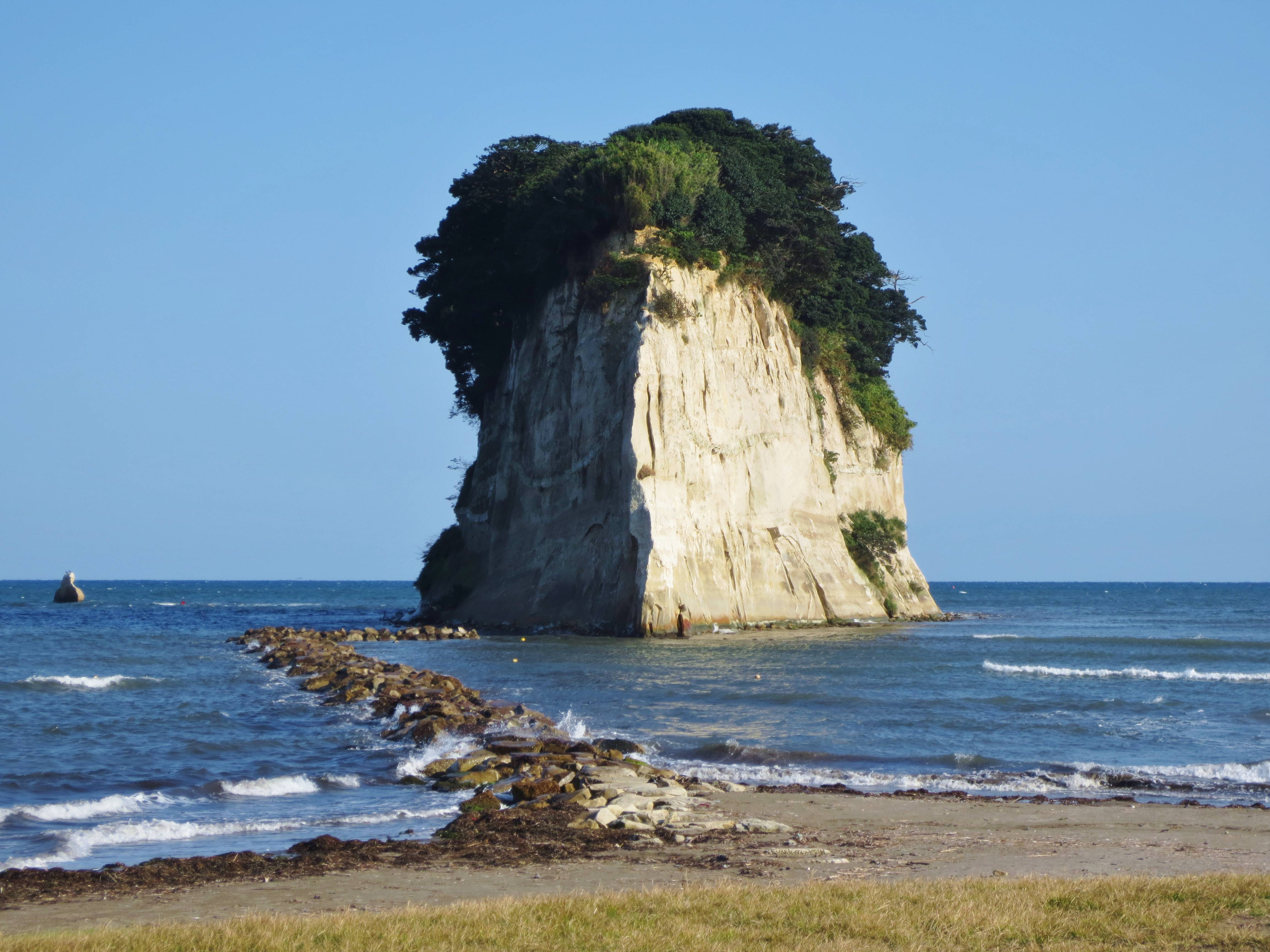
Mitsukejima, "Battleship Island"

The sea currents circulate in the counterclockwise direction. The Kuroshio (Japan Current), the Tsushima Current and the East Korea Warm Current bring warmer and more saline water to the north. There they merge into the Tsugaru Current and flow into the Pacific Ocean through the Tsugaru Strait. They also feed the Sōya Current and exit through the La Perouse Strait to the Sea of Okhotsk. The returning branch is composed of the Liman, North Korea and Central (or Mid-) Japan Sea currents which bring fresh and cold water along the Asian coast to the south.

Water temperature is mostly affected by exchange with the atmosphere in the northern part of the sea and by the currents in the southern part. Winter temperatures are 0 °C (32 °F) or below in the north and 10–14 °C (50–57 °F) in the south. In this season, there is a significant temperature difference between the western and eastern parts owing to the circular currents. So at the latitude of Peter the Great Gulf, the water temperature is about 0 °C (32 °F) in the west and 5–6 °C (41–43 °F) in the east. This east-west difference drops to 1–2 °C (1.8–3.6 °F) in summer, and the temperatures rise to 18–20 °C (64–68 °F) in the north and 25–27 °C (77–81 °F) in the south.

Because the sea is enclosed, its waters form clearly separated layers which may show seasonal and spatial dependence. In winter, the temperature is almost constant with the depth in the northern part of the sea. However, in central-southern parts, it may be 8–10 °C (46–50 °F) down to 100–150 m (330–490 ft), 2–4 °C (36–39 °F) at 200–250 m (660–820 ft), 1.0–1.5 °C (33.8–34.7 °F) at 400–500 m (1,300–1,600 ft) and then remain at about 0 °C (32 °F) until the bottom. Heating by the sun and tropical monsoons increases the depth gradient in spring–summer.

In the north the surface layer (down to 15 m or 49 ft) may heat up to 18–20 °C (64–68 °F). The temperature would drop sharply to 4 °C (39 °F) at 50 m (160 ft), then slowly decrease to 1 °C (34 °F) at 250 m (820 ft) and remain so down to the seabed. On the contrary, the temperature in the south could gradually decrease to 6 °C (43 °F) at 200 m (660 ft), then to 2 °C (36 °F) at 260 m (850 ft) and to 0.04–0.14 °C (32.07–32.25 °F) at 1,000–1,500 m (3,300–4,900 ft), but then it would rise to about 0.3 °C (32.5 °F) near the bottom. This cold layer at about 1,000 m (3,300 ft) is formed by sinking of cold water in the northern part of the sea in winter and is brought south by the sea currents; it is rather stable and is observed all through the year.

The hydrological isolation of the Sea of Japan also results in slightly lower average water salinity (34.09‰, where ‰ means parts per thousand) compared with the Pacific Ocean. In winter, the highest salinity at 34.5‰ is observed in the south where evaporation dominates over precipitation. It is the lowest at 33.8‰ in the south-east and south-west because of frequent rains, and remains at about 34.09‰ in most other parts.

Thawing of ice in spring reduces water salinity in the north, but it remains high at 34.60–34.70‰ in the south, partly because of the inflow of salty water through the Korea Strait. A typical variation of salinity across the sea in summer is 31.5‰ to 34.5‰ from north to south. The depth distribution of salinity is relatively constant. The surface layer tends to be more fresh in the sea parts which experience ice melting and rains. The average water density is 1.0270 g/cm^{3} in the north and 1.0255 g/cm^{3} in the south in winter. It lowers in summer to 1.0253 and 1.0215 g/cm^{3}, respectively.

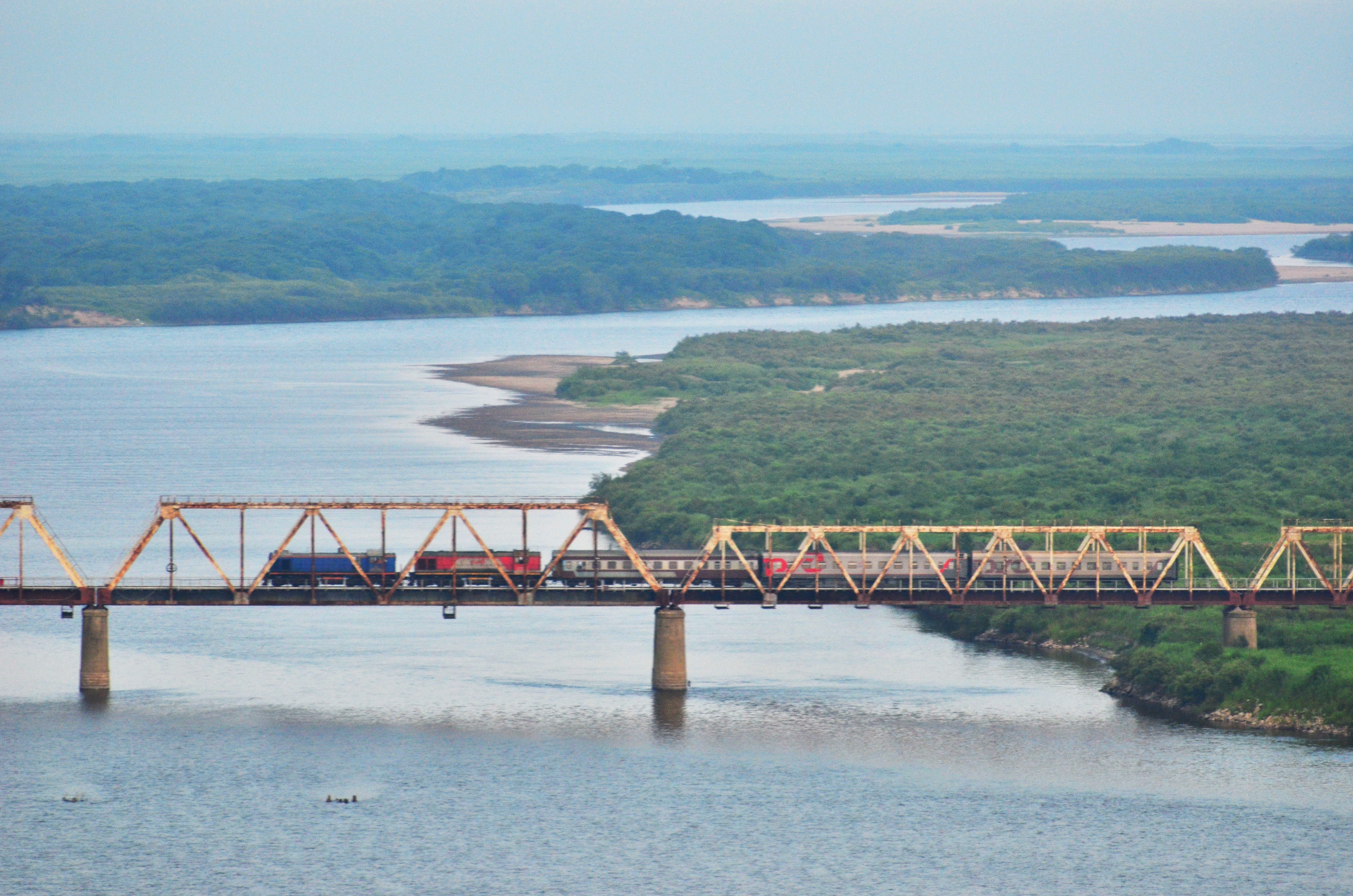
The Tumen River flows into the Sea of Japan. The last 17 km of the river form the border between North Korea and Russia. This picture is of the Korea Russia Friendship Bridge that crosses the Tumen River.

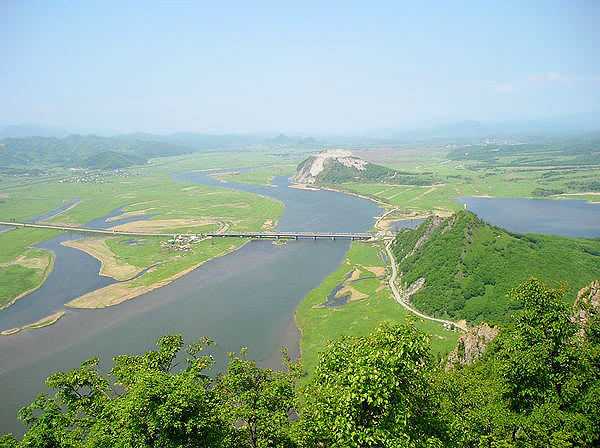
The mouth of Partizanskaya River near Nakhodka. View from Sopka Sestra.

Few rivers flow into the Sea of Japan from mainland Asia, the largest being Tumen, Rudnaya, Samarga, Partizanskaya and Tumnin; all of them have a mountainous character. In contrast, numerous large rivers flow from Honshū and Hokkaidō into the sea, including Japan's four largest rivers: the Shinano, Ishikari, Agano and Mogami. The total annual river discharge into the sea is 210 km^{3} (50 cu mi) and is relatively constant through the year, except for a minor increase in July. Most water (97% or 52,200 km^{3} [12,500 cu mi]) flows into the sea through the Korea Strait and discharges through the Tsugaru (64% or 34,610 km^{3} [8,300 cu mi], La Pérouse 10,380 km^{3} [2,490 cu mi]) and Korea straits. Rainfall, evaporation and riverine inflow make only 1% of the water balance. Between October and April, the outflow exceeds the inflow due to the lower income through the Korea Strait; this balance reverses between May and September.

The sea has complex tides, which are induced by the tidal wave of the Pacific Ocean penetrating through the Korea Strait and Tsugaru strait. The tides are semi-diurnal (rise twice a day) in the Korea Strait and in the northern part of the Strait of Tartary. They are diurnal at the eastern shore of Korea, Russian Far East and the Japanese islands of Honshū and Hokkaidō. Mixed tides occur in Peter the Great Gulf and Korea strait. The tidal waves have a speed of 10–25 cm/s (4–10 in/s) in the open sea. They accelerate in the Korea Strait (40–60 cm/s or 16–24 in/s), La Pérouse Strait (50–100 cm/s or 20–40 in/s) and especially in the Tsugaru Strait (100–200 cm/s or 40–80 in/s).

The amplitude of the tides is relatively low and varies strongly across the sea. It reaches 3 meters in the south near the Korea Strait, but quickly drops northwards to 1.5 m (5 ft) at the southern tip of Korean Peninsula and to 0.5 m (1.6 ft) at the North Korean shores. Similar low tides are observed in Hokkaidō, Honshū and south Sakhalin. The amplitude however increases to 2.3–2.8 m (7.5–9.2 ft) toward the north of the Strait of Tartary due to its funnel-like shape. Apart from tides, the water level also displays seasonal, monsoon-related variations across the entire sea with the highest levels observed in summer and lowest in winter. Wind may also locally change the water level by 20–25 cm (8–10 in); for example, it is higher in summer at the Korean and lower at the Japanese coasts.

The sea waters have blue to green-blue color and a transparency of about 10 m (33 ft). They are rich in dissolved oxygen, especially in the western and northern parts, which are colder and have more phytoplankton than the eastern and southern areas. The oxygen concentration is 95% of the saturation point near the surface; it decreases with the depth to about 70% at 3,000 m (9,800 ft).

== Flora and fauna ==
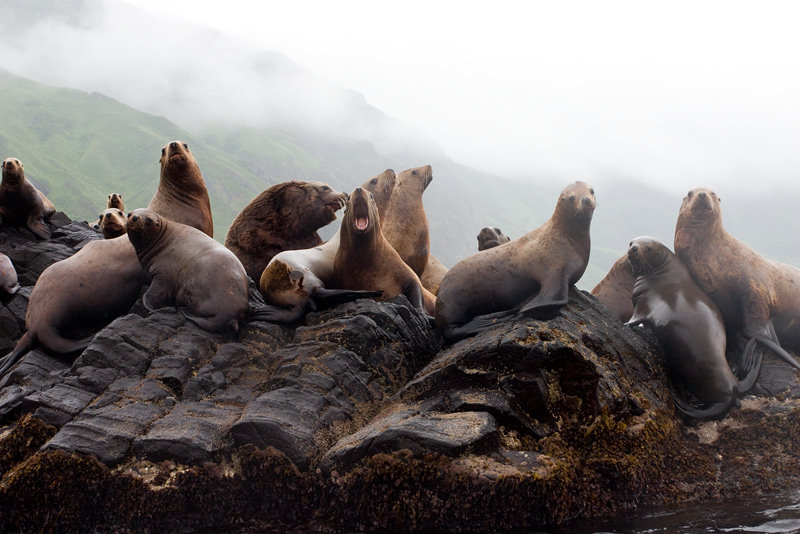
Sea lions on Moneron Island

The high concentration of dissolved oxygen results in the rich aquatic life of the Sea of Japan – there are more than 800 species of aquatic plants and more than 3,500 animal species, including more than 900 species of crustaceans, about 1,000 of fish and 26 of mammals. The coastal areas contain several kg/m^{2} of biomass. Pelagic (oceanic) fishes include saury, mackerel, Jack mackerels, sardines, anchovies, herring, sea bream, squid and various species of salmon and trout. The demersal (sea-bottom) fishes include cod, pollock and Atka mackerel.

Mammals are represented by seals and whales (ancient name for the basin in Chinese was "Sea of Whales"), and the crustaceans by shrimps and crabs. Because of the shallow straits connecting the sea with Pacific Ocean, the Sea of Japan has no characteristic oceanic deep-water fauna. Flora and fauna unique to the region near the Sea of Japan are known as "Japan Sea elements".

== Economy ==
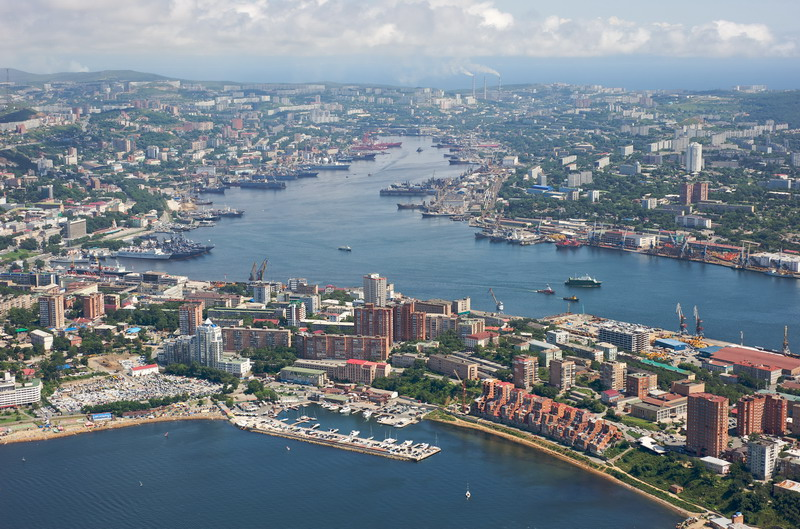
Zolotoy Rog bay near Vladivostok, Russia

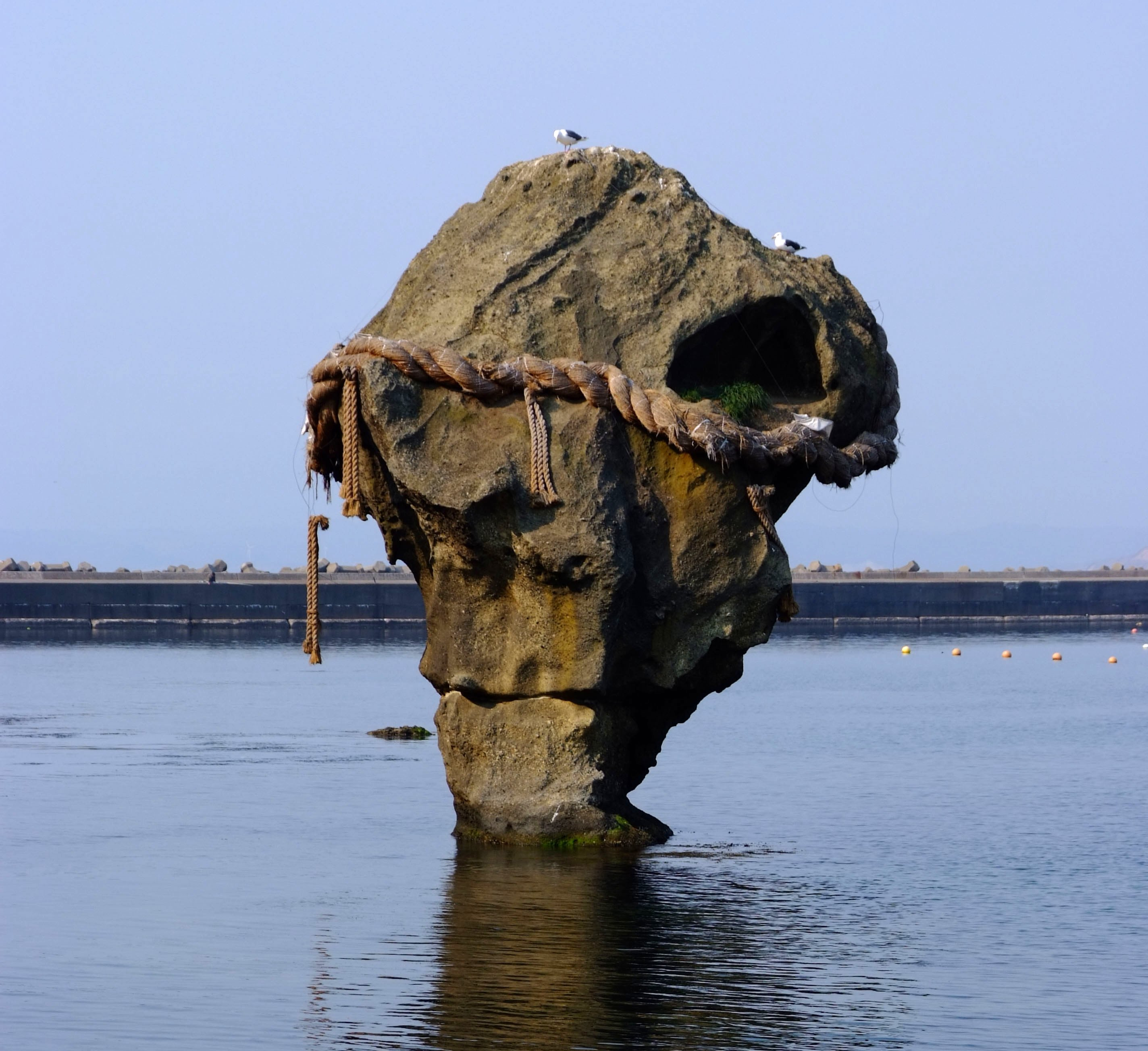
Heishi rock near Kamome Island, Hokkaido

Fishery had long been the main economic activity on the Sea of Japan. It is mainly carried out on and near the continental shelves and focuses on herring, sardines and bluefin tuna. These species are however depleted from after World War II. Squid is mostly caught near the sea center and salmon near the northern and south-western shores. There is also a well-developed seaweed production.

The importance of the fishery in the sea is illustrated by the territorial disputes between Japan and South Korea over Liancourt Rocks and between Japan and Russia over the Kuril Islands. It is also reflected in various legends, such as the legend of the Heishi rock, which says that once when herring vanished, an old fairy threw a bottle with magic water into the sea, and the herring returned. The bottle got stuck to the seabed and turned into a rock, which became a representation of the God of the Sea of Japan.

Vladivostok is a base for the Russian whaling fleet. Although it operates in the northern seas, its production is processed and partly distributed in the Vladivostok area. Vladivostok is also a terminal point of the Trans-Siberian Railway which brings many goods to and from this major port. There is a regular ferry service across the Strait of Tartary between the Russian continental port of Vanino and Kholmsk in Sakhalin.

The sea has magnetite sands as well as natural gas and petroleum fields near the northern part of Japan and Sakhalin Island. The intensity of shipments across the sea is moderate, owing to the cold relations between many bordering countries. As a result, the largest Japanese ports are on the Pacific coast, and the significant ports on the Sea of Japan are Niigata, Tsuruta and Maizuru. Major South Korean ports are Busan, Ulsan, and Pohang situated on the south-eastern coast of the Korean Peninsula, but they also mainly target countries not bordering the Sea of Japan.

The major Russian port of Vladivostok mainly serves inland cargos, whereas Nakhodka and Vostochny are more international and have a busy exchange with Japan and South Korea. Other prominent Russian ports are Sovetskaya Gavan, Alexandrovsk-Sakhalinsky and Kholmsk, and the major ports of North Korea are Wonsan, Hamhung and Chongjin. The intensity of shipments across the Sea of Japan is steadily increasing as a result of the growth of East Asian economies.

== See also ==
- Geography of Japan
- Geography of Korea
  - Geography of North Korea
  - Geography of South Korea
- Geography of Russia
- Category:Islands of the Sea of Japan
