= Sibiryakov =

Sibiryakov is a Russian (Сибиряков) or Ukrainian (Сібіряков) surname.

Notable people with the surname include:

- Alexander Sibiryakov (1849-1933), Russian gold mine and factories owner and explorer of Siberia
- Andrei Sibiryakov (1964-1989/1990), Russian serial killer
- Eduard Sibiryakov (1941–2004), Russian volleyball player
- Serhiy Sibiryakov (born 1982), Ukrainian-born Russian footballer
