= Mount Kamui (Okushiri) =

Mountain in Okushiri, Hokkaido, Japan

- 神威山

Highest point
- Elevation: 584 m (1,916 ft)
- Prominence: 584 m (1,916 ft)
- Listing: List of mountains and hills of Japan by height
- Coordinates: 42°9′37″N 139°26′34″E

Naming
- English translation: Mountain of the Gods
- Language of name: Ainu

Geography
- Location: Hokkaidō, Japan
- Topo map(s): Geographical Survey Institute 25000:1 神威脇; 25000:1 赤石; 50000:1 久遠

Mount Kamui (神威山, Kamui San) is the highest mountain on Okushiri Island in Okushiri, Hokkaidō, Japan. The name of the mountain is derived from the Ainu word kamui, meaning deity or god.
