= Sibiryakov Island (Primorsky Krai) =

Russian island in the Peter the Great Gulf, in the Sea of Japan

Coordinates: 42°48′25″N 131°26′43″E

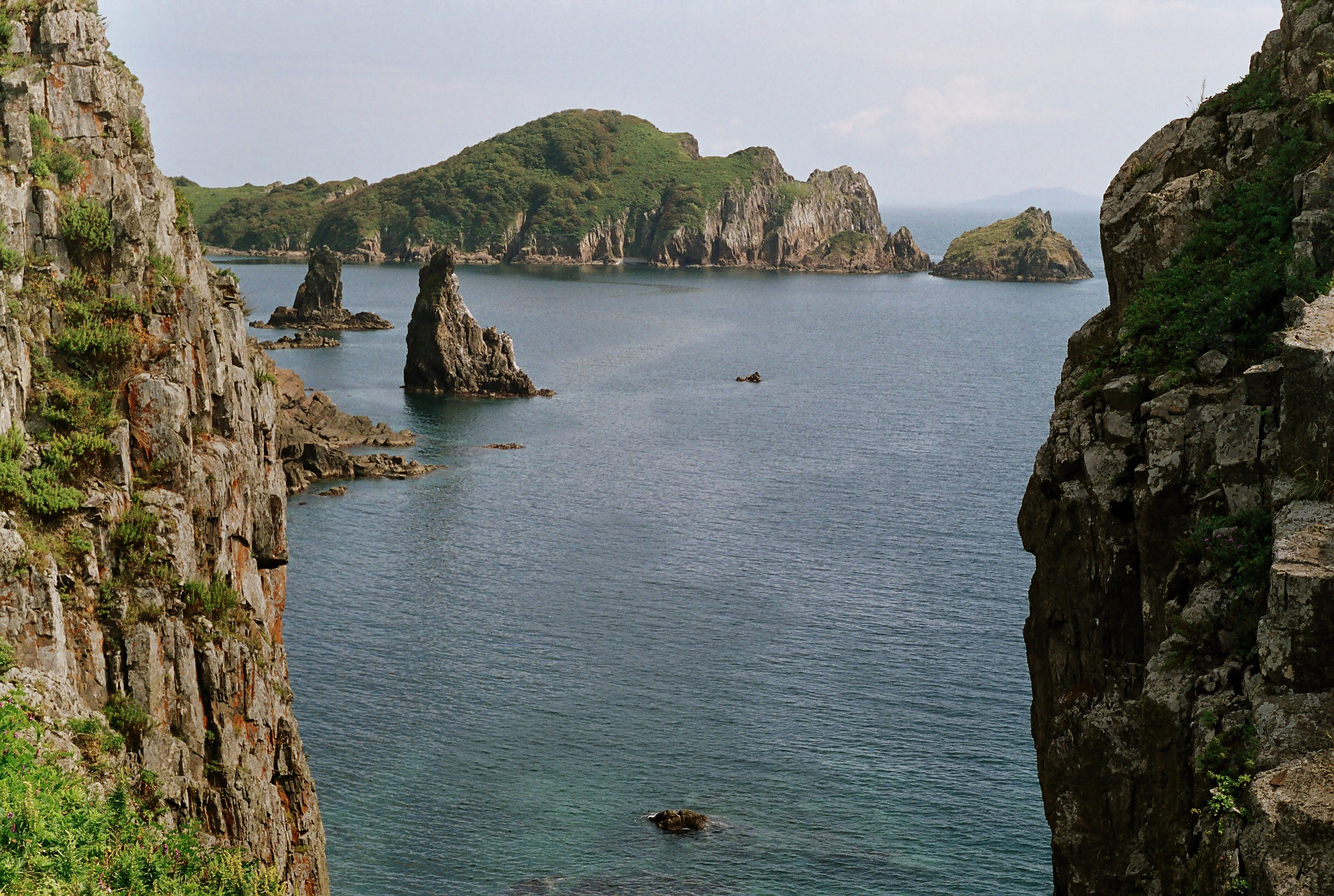
A bay on Sibiryakov Island

Sibiryakov Island (Russian: Остров Сибирякова, Ostrov Sibiryakova) is a Russian island in the Peter the Great Gulf, in the Sea of Japan.
