= Shigenori =

- Gender: Male

Origin
- Origin: Japanese
- Meaning: Different meanings depending on the kanji used

Shigenori (written: 茂徳, 重徳, 重矩, 滋則, 茂憲, 茂矩, 樹頼 or 樹範) is a masculine Japanese given name. Notable people with the name include:

- Chikamatsu Shigenori (近松 茂矩), Japanese writer
- Shigenori Hagimura (萩村 滋則; born 1976), Japanese footballer
- Itakura Shigenori (板倉 重矩; 1617–1673), Japanese daimyō
- Shigenori Kuroda (黒田 重徳; 1887–1952), Japanese general
- Shigenori Mori (born 1958), Japanese golfer
- Shigenori Sōya (宗矢 樹頼), Japanese voice actor
- Shigenori Tōgō (東郷 茂徳; 1882–1950), Japanese politician
- Wakajishi Shigenori (若獅子 茂憲; born 1948), Japanese sumo wrestler
- Shigenori Yamazaki (山崎 樹範; born 1974), Japanese actor and voice actor
