= Ōhikari Sadayuki =

Japanese rikishi (1927–1996)

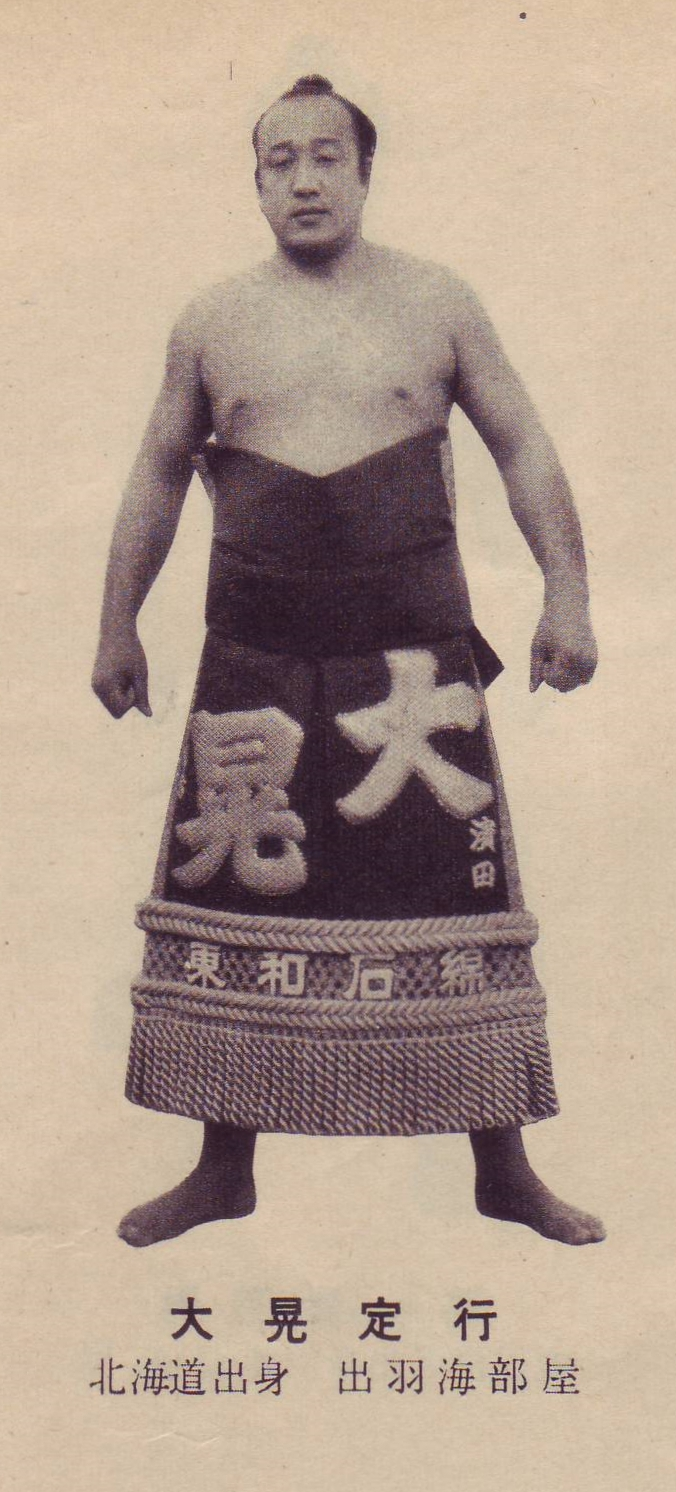

Personal information
- Native name: 大晃定行
- Born: Sadayuki Shibata; September 24, 1927
- Died: January 14, 1996 (aged 68)
- Height: 1.81 m (5 ft 11 1/2 in)
- Weight: 155 kg (342 lb)

Sport
- Sport: Sumo
- Retired: November 1963
- Heya: Dewanoumi
- Record: 526-539-15-3draws
- Debut: January 1944
- Highest rank: Komusubi (July 1958)
- Elder name: Ōnomatsu
- Special Prizes: 1 (Fighting Spirit)
- Gold Stars: 5

Ōhikari Sadayuki (September 24, 1927 – January 14, 1996, real name Sadayuki Shibata) was a sumo wrestler and coach from Kamiiso, Hokkaido, Japan. He made his professional debut in January 1944, reaching the top makuuchi division in 1950. His highest rank was komusubi. He was a runner-up in the May 1956 tournament and earned five kinboshi or gold stars for defeating yokozuna during his career. He retired in 1963 and became an elder of the Japan Sumo Association under the name Ōnomatsu Oyakata, working as a coach at Dewanoumi stable. He died in 1996 at the age of 68.

== Career ==
Born and raised in what is now known as the city of Hokuto in Hokkaido, his first job after graduating from school was as a driver but he had a large physique which was well suited to sumo, and he was recruited by future yokozuna Chiyonoyama, who came from the nearby town of Fukushima in Hokkaido. He joined Dewanoumi stable in January 1944. Originally fighting under his own surname of Shibata, he reached the jūryō division in January 1949 and adopted the shikona of Ōhikari in January 1950. He reached the top makuuchi division in September of that year. In September 1952 he defeated his first yokozuna, Azumafuji, although he finished the tournament with only four wins against eleven losses. His best result in a tournament was in May 1956 when he was runner-up to then ōzeki Wakanohana Kanji I, losing to him in a playoff for the yūshō or championship after both wrestlers finished with identical 12–3 records. He had fought only his fellow maegashira ranked wrestlers until the final day, when he defeated sekiwake Tsurugamine. Ōhikari was awarded the Fighting Spirit sanshō or special prize, the only one of his career. He made his debut in the sanyaku ranks at komusubi in July 1958, but fell just short of a majority of wins with a 7–8 record. He had one more appearance at komusubi in November 1958.

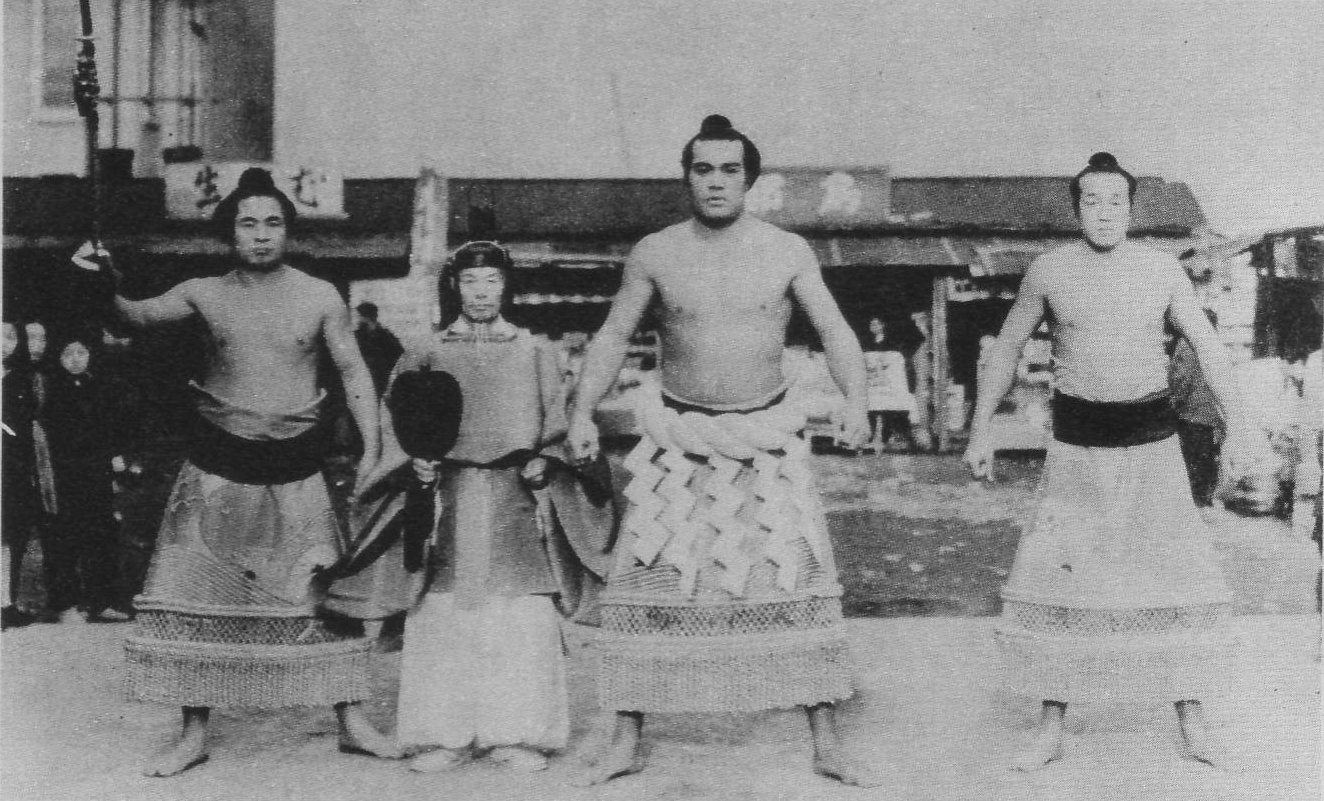
Ōhikari (far right) with stablemate Chiyonoyama in 1951

He was known for his endurance and ability to avoid injury, and on the seventh day of the January 1963 tournament, he became the first wrestler to fight 1000 consecutive matches from his professional debut. He extended this record to 1068 matches, but a ruptured Achilles tendon in November 1963 ended his streak, and he immediately announced his retirement. 945 of those bouts had been in the top division, which is the seventh longest consecutive run of makuuchi bouts as of 2017. He had fought in the top division for 13 years and 64 tournaments, with 455 wins against 489 losses, and one draw. He had five gold stars, his yokozuna wins coming against Azumafuji, Kagamisato, and Wakanohana I (three times). Despite fighting in 79 career tournaments, he never managed to win a championship in any division.

== Retirement from sumo ==
Ōhikari stayed in sumo as an elder of the Japan Sumo Association, working as a coach at Dewanoumi stable under the name of Ōnomatsu Oyakata until reaching the mandatory retirement age of 65 in September 1992. He sold his Ōnomatsu stock to former sekiwake Masurao, who went on to found Ōnomatsu stable. He died in January 1996 at the age of 68.

== Fighting style ==
Ōhikari liked to push and thrust at his opponents, and was known for the power of his tsuppari, a series of rapid thrusts to the chest. His most common winning kimarite or techniques were yori kiri (force out), utchari (ring edge throw) and oshi-dashi (push out).

== Pre-modern top division record ==
- The New Year tournament began and the Spring tournament returned to Osaka in 1953.

Ōhikari Sadayuki
-	Spring Haru basho, Tokyo	Summer Natsu basho, Tokyo	Autumn Aki basho, Tokyo
1944	(Maezumo)	West Jonokuchi #3; 3–2	West Jonidan #29; 3–2
1945	Not held	East Sandanme #29; 3–2	West Sandanme #11; 2–3
1946	Not held	Not held	East Sandanme #14; 4–3
1947	Not held	West Sandanme #4; 4–1	East Makushita #16; 3–2–1draw
1948	Not held	East Makushita #7; 3–3	West Makushita #5; 5–1
1949	East Jūryō #10; 6–7	East Jūryō #11; 9–6	East Jūryō #6; 7–8
1950	East Jūryō #7; 9–6	West Jūryō #2; 10–4–1draw	West Maegashira #16; 7–8
1951	East Maegashira #17; 6–9	West Maegashira #20; 8–7	West Maegashira #16; 8–7
1952	East Maegashira #15; 8–7	West Maegashira #12; 11–4	East Maegashira #2; 4–11 ★
Record given as wins–losses–absences Top division champion Top division runner-up Retired Lower divisions Non-participation Sanshō key: F=Fighting spirit; O=Outstanding performance; T=Technique Also shown: ★=Kinboshi; P=Playoff(s); Divisions: Makuuchi — Jūryō — Makushita — Sandanme — Jonidan — Jonokuchi Makuuchi ranks: Yokozuna — Ōzeki — Sekiwake — Komusubi — Maegashira

-	New Year Hatsu basho, Tokyo	Spring Haru basho, Osaka	Summer Natsu basho, Tokyo	Autumn Aki basho, Tokyo
1953	West Maegashira #6; 7–8	West Maegashira #7; 5–10	West Maegashira #11; 5–10	West Maegashira #14; 9–6
1954	East Maegashira #11; 6–9	East Maegashira #14; 7–8	West Maegashira #15; 6–9	West Maegashira #17; 7–8
1955	West Maegashira #18; 9–6	West Maegashira #13; 8–7	East Maegashira #12; 6–9	West Maegashira #14; 7–8
1956	East Maegashira #15; 9–6	West Maegashira #8; 7–8	West Maegashira #9; 12–3–P; F	West Maegashira #3; 3–12
Record given as wins–losses–absences Top division champion Top division runner-up Retired Lower divisions Non-participation Sanshō key: F=Fighting spirit; O=Outstanding performance; T=Technique Also shown: ★=Kinboshi; P=Playoff(s); Divisions: Makuuchi — Jūryō — Makushita — Sandanme — Jonidan — Jonokuchi Makuuchi ranks: Yokozuna — Ōzeki — Sekiwake — Komusubi — Maegashira

== Modern top division tournament record ==
- Since the addition of the Kyushu tournament in 1957 and the Nagoya tournament in 1958, the yearly schedule has remained unchanged.

Year	January Hatsu basho, Tokyo	March Haru basho, Osaka	May Natsu basho, Tokyo	July Nagoya basho, Nagoya	September Aki basho, Tokyo	November Kyūshū basho, Fukuoka
1957	East Maegashira #11; 8–7	East Maegashira #9; 8–7	West Maegashira #7; 5–10	x	West Maegashira #15; 10–5	East Maegashira #9; 9–6
1958	West Maegashira #4; 7–8 ★	East Maegashira #5; 8–7	West Maegashira #3; 9–6	East Komusubi; 7–8	East Maegashira #1; 8–7	East Komusubi #2; 4–11
1959	East Maegashira #4; 9–6	East Maegashira #2; 6–9	East Maegashira #7; 7–8	West Maegashira #8; 6–9	East Maegashira #11; 9–6	East Maegashira #4; 9–6 ★
1960	East Maegashira #1; 7–8	East Maegashira #3; 9–6	East Maegashira #1; 6–9	West Maegashira #3; 5–10	East Maegashira #5; 9–6	West Maegashira #1; 7–8 ★
1961	West Maegashira #2; 4–11	East Maegashira #6; 9–6	East Maegashira #2; 6–9	West Maegashira #5; 9–6	West Maegashira #1; 6–9 ★	West Maegashira #4; 6–9
1962	East Maegashira #10; 8–7	East Maegashira #9; 5–10	East Maegashira #12; 10–5	East Maegashira #7; 10–5	West Maegashira #1; 5–10	West Maegashira #6; 6–9
1963	East Maegashira #11; 9–6	West Maegashira #4; 5–10	West Maegashira #7; 6–9	West Maegashira #9; 7–8	East Maegashira #10; 7–7–1draw	West Maegashira #10; Retired; 0–0–15
Record given as wins–losses–absences Top division champion Top division runner-up Retired Lower divisions Non-participation Sanshō key: F=Fighting spirit; O=Outstanding performance; T=Technique Also shown: ★=Kinboshi; P=Playoff(s); Divisions: Makuuchi — Jūryō — Makushita — Sandanme — Jonidan — Jonokuchi Makuuchi ranks: Yokozuna — Ōzeki — Sekiwake — Komusubi — Maegashira

== See also ==
- List of past sumo wrestlers
- List of komusubi
- Glossary of sumo terms
