= Kise stable =

Defunct sumo stable

The Kise stable (木瀬部屋, Kise-beya), also known as Kimura Sehei stable, was a stable of the Tatsunami group from 1958 to 2000.

== History ==
The original Kise stable (which had no connection to the current incarnation founded by the former Higonoumi) was led by the chief referee Kimura Shōnosuke and several other referees also took charge of it (a practice no longer permitted). Its ninth master was however a former wrestler, maegashira Katsuragawa, who re–established the stable in 1958. He resigned voluntarily from the Sumo Association in 1967 and his son-in-law, maegashira Kiyonomori retired from active competition and took over from him. It was the only stable to allow amateurs as well as professionals to train in it, and it was also open to practitioners of other martial arts such as kendo. Kiyonomori led the stable until he reached the mandatory retirement age in 2000, at which point the stable folded, having produced no sekitori since the early 1980s.

== Notable wrestlers ==
- Aobayama Hirotoshi (komusubi)
- Tengoyama Takakiyo (juryo)

== See also ==
- List of sumo stables
- List of sumo elders
- List of active sumo wrestlers
- List of past sumo wrestlers
- List of years in sumo
- Glossary of sumo terms
