= Wakabayama Sadao =

Japanese sumo wrestler (1922–2001)

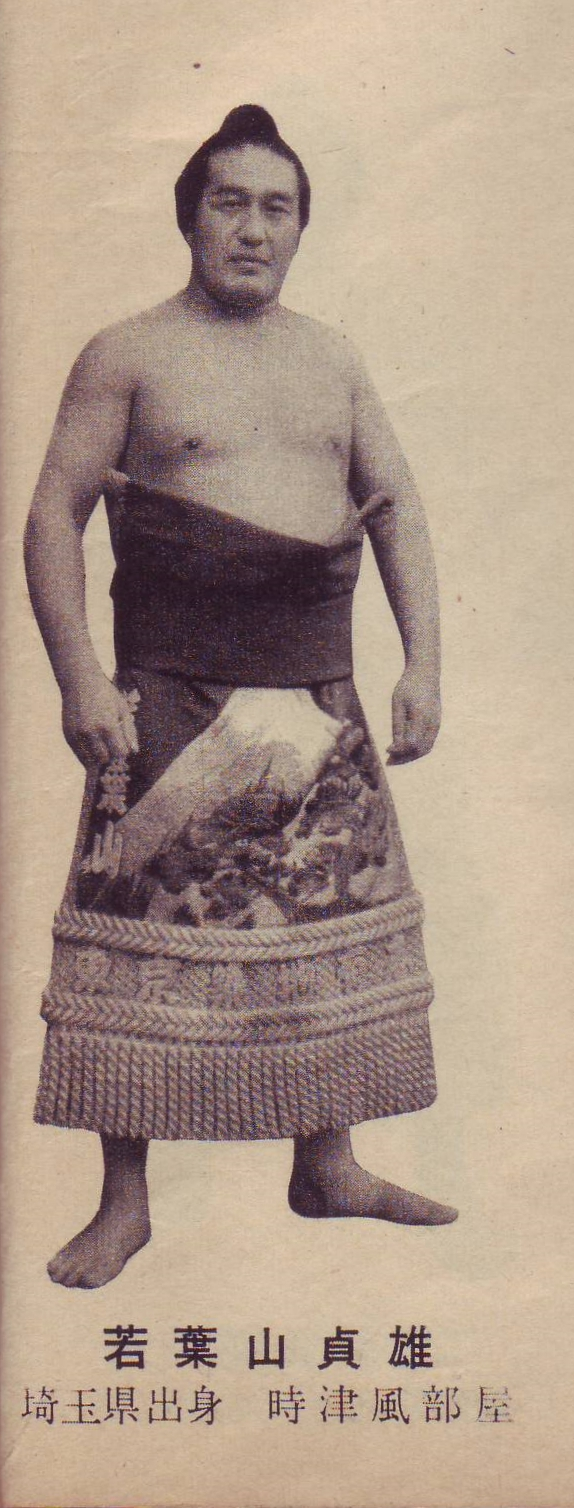

Personal information
- Native name: 若葉山 貞雄
- Born: Sadao Iwahira; November 9, 1922 Yame, Fukuoka, Japan
- Died: January 17, 2001 (aged 78)
- Height: 1.73 m (5 ft 8 in)
- Weight: 94 kg (207 lb; 14.8 st)

Sport
- Sport: Sumo
- Retired: January, 1961
- Heya: Tokitsukaze
- Record: 413-466-6-1draw
- Debut: January, 1942
- Highest rank: Komusubi (September, 1951)
- Elder name: Shikoroyama
- Championships: 1 (Jūryō)
- Special Prizes: 1 (Outstanding Performance)
- Gold Stars: 4 Terukuni (2); Azumafuji (2)
- Updated on June 2020

Wakabayama Sadao (若葉山 貞雄; November 9, 1922 – January 17, 2001) was a sumo wrestler from Yame, Fukuoka, Japan. His highest rank was komusubi. He earned four gold stars for defeating yokozuna. After his retirement from active competition in 1961 he became an elder of the Japan Sumo Association under the name Shikoroyama.

== Career ==
Wakabayama was born in Beijing, China, and was separated from his parents while still a child. He attempted to locate his parents who he believed might have returned to Japan by joining a sumo touring party. Upon joining professional sumo he took the Japanese surname of Iwahira. He was recruited by the active yokozuna Futabayama and joined his Futabayama stable (later Tokitsukaze stable) in January 1942. He used Iwahira as his fighting name until one tournament after he was promoted to the top makuuchi division, when he adopted the shikona of Wakabayama, taking two characters from his head coach Futabayama. His birthplace was recorded on the banzuke as Yame, Fukuoka, although he later changed his surname to Aoyama (his wife's) and his birthplace to Omiya, Saitama. His promotion followed his yusho or tournament championship in the juryo division in November 1946, the only tournament held that year. Following his strong performance in the May 1951 tournament, where he defeated two yokozuna and won the Outstanding Performance Prize, he was promoted to komusubi in September 1951, which was to be his highest rank. He fought in the top division for 49 tournaments with a win/loss record of 326/383. He was demoted from makuuchi in November 1959 after recording only one win against 14 losses. He competed in the juryo division until announcing his retirement after the January 1961 tournament.

== Retirement from sumo ==
Following his retirement Wakabayama remained with the Japan Sumo Association as an elder under the name Shikoroyama Oyakata, and worked as a coach at Tokitsukaze stable until reaching the mandatory retirement age of 65 in November 1987.

== Death ==
Wakabayama died of a cerebral thrombosis on January 17, 2001, in Fukushima. He was 78.

== Family ==
Wakabayama's son-in-law Masashi Onami was a sumo wrestler in the Tatsutagawa stable, fighting as Wakashinobu and reaching a highest rank of makushita 51. Three of his grandsons also became sumo wrestlers, all fighting out of the Arashio stable. The first was Onami (now Wakatakamoto) in 2009, followed by Goshi (now Wakamotoharu) in 2011. Wakatakakage, an amateur champion at Toyo University, joined as a sandanme tsukedashi entrant in March 2017, reached the makuuchi division in November 2019 and won the 2022 Osaka tournament.

== Fighting style ==
Wakabayama was small for a sumo wrestler at 1.73 m (5 ft 8 in) and 94 kg (207 lb), but he was a noted technician. His favourite techniques included ashitori (leg grab) and shitatehineri (twisting underarm throw).

== Pre-modern top division record ==
- The New Year tournament began and the Spring tournament returned to Osaka in 1953.

Wakabayama Sadao
-	Spring Haru basho, Tokyo	Summer Natsu basho, Tokyo	Autumn Aki basho, Tokyo
1942	(Maezumo)	West Jonokuchi #6; 7–1	Not held
1943	West Jonidan #32; 6–2	East Sandanme #46; 5–3	Not held
1944	East Sandanme #14; 6–2	West Makushita #30; 3–2	East Makushita #20; 2–3
1945	Not held	East Makushita #23; 5–0	East Makushita #2; 4–1
1946	Not held	Not held	West Jūryō #6; 10–5; Champion
1947	Not held	East Maegashira #17; 4–6	East Maegashira #18; 6–5
1948	Not held	East Maegashira #15; 4–7	West Maegashira #19; 5–6
1949	West Maegashira #19; 8–5	East Maegashira #11; 8–7	West Maegashira #9; 6–9
1950	East Maegashira #11; 7–8	West Maegashira #11; 7–8	West Maegashira #12; 8–7
1951	West Maegashira #9; 10–5	West Maegashira #2; 8–7; O★★	West Komusubi; 6–9
1952	East Maegashira #1; 3–12	West Maegashira #7; 10–5	West Maegashira #1; 7–8 ★
Record given as wins–losses–absences Top division champion Top division runner-up Retired Lower divisions Non-participation Sanshō key: F=Fighting spirit; O=Outstanding performance; T=Technique Also shown: ★=Kinboshi; P=Playoff(s); Divisions: Makuuchi — Jūryō — Makushita — Sandanme — Jonidan — Jonokuchi Makuuchi ranks: Yokozuna — Ōzeki — Sekiwake — Komusubi — Maegashira

-	New Year Hatsu basho, Tokyo	Spring Haru basho, Osaka	Summer Natsu basho, Tokyo	Autumn Aki basho, Tokyo
1953	East Maegashira #3; 2–13	West Maegashira #9; 7–8	East Maegashira #10; 8–7	West Maegashira #7; 6–9
1954	West Maegashira #11; 10–5	West Maegashira #4; 6–9 ★	East Maegashira #6; 4–11	West Maegashira #10; 8–7
1955	West Maegashira #8; 9–6	West Maegashira #4; 7–8	East Maegashira #5; 3–12	East Maegashira #11; 10–5
1956	West Maegashira #4; 7–8	West Maegashira #4; 6–9	East Maegashira #7; 7–8	East Maegashira #8; 5–10
Record given as wins–losses–absences Top division champion Top division runner-up Retired Lower divisions Non-participation Sanshō key: F=Fighting spirit; O=Outstanding performance; T=Technique Also shown: ★=Kinboshi; P=Playoff(s); Divisions: Makuuchi — Jūryō — Makushita — Sandanme — Jonidan — Jonokuchi Makuuchi ranks: Yokozuna — Ōzeki — Sekiwake — Komusubi — Maegashira

== Modern top division tournament record ==
- Since the addition of the Kyushu tournament in 1957 and the Nagoya tournament in 1958, the yearly schedule has remained unchanged.

Year	January Hatsu basho, Tokyo	March Haru basho, Osaka	May Natsu basho, Tokyo	July Nagoya basho, Nagoya	September Aki basho, Tokyo	November Kyūshū basho, Fukuoka
1957	West Maegashira #12; 9–6	West Maegashira #9; 4–5–6	West Maegashira #12; 8–7	Not held	East Maegashira #10; 6–9	West Maegashira #12; 7–8
1958	West Maegashira #13; 9–6	West Maegashira #10; 9–6	East Maegashira #6; 3–12	East Maegashira #15; 9–6	East Maegashira #13; 8–6–1draw	East Maegashira #12; 5–10
1959	East Maegashira #19; 9–6	East Maegashira #13; 7–8	West Maegashira #14; 9–6	West Maegashira #11; 5–10	East Maegashira #14; 7–8	East Maegashira #13; 1–14
1960	East Jūryō #3; 8–7	East Jūryō #1; 6–9	West Jūryō #3; 5–10	West Jūryō #9; 5–10	West Jūryō #12; 8–7	West Jūryō #11; 5–10
1961	East Jūryō #19; Retired; 2–13	x	x	x	x	x
Record given as wins–losses–absences Top division champion Top division runner-up Retired Lower divisions Non-participation Sanshō key: F=Fighting spirit; O=Outstanding performance; T=Technique Also shown: ★=Kinboshi; P=Playoff(s); Divisions: Makuuchi — Jūryō — Makushita — Sandanme — Jonidan — Jonokuchi Makuuchi ranks: Yokozuna — Ōzeki — Sekiwake — Komusubi — Maegashira

== See also ==
- List of past sumo wrestlers
- List of sumo tournament second division champions
- List of komusubi
