= List of komusubi =

This is a list of all sumo wrestlers whose pinnacle in the sport has been the fourth highest rank of komusubi and who held the rank in the modern era of sumo since the 1927 merger of the Tokyo and Osaka organizations. Wrestlers who went on to be promoted to sekiwake, ōzeki or yokozuna can be seen in the List of sekiwake, List of ōzeki and List of yokozuna.

While it is required and most common for each rankings chart (banzuke) to list exactly two wrestlers at this rank, instances of three or even four active komusubi have occurred on rare occasions.

The number of tournaments (basho) at komusubi is also listed. Wrestlers who won a top division championship (yūshō) are indicated in bold. Active wrestlers are indicated by italics.

The table is up to date as of the start of the November 2026 tournament.

== List ==
Name	Basho at rank	Born	From	Promoted	End of rank
Manazuru Shugoro	5	1902	Tenri, Nara	1928	1929*
Tomoegata Seiichi	1	1911	Hakodate, Hokkaido	1935	1935
Wakashima Saburo	1	1906	Hidaka, Wakayama	1937	1937
Kyūshuzan Yoshio	1	1913	Yamada, Fukuoka	1938	1938
Matsuragata Tatsuya	1	1915	Higashimatsuura, Saga	1942	1942
Sakuranishiki Morihiro	2	1916	Kitatsugaru, Aomori	1947	1948*
Kotonishiki Noboru	3	1922	Kan'onji, Kagawa	1947	1952*
Itsutsuumi Yoshio	1	1922	Minami-Matsuura, Nagasaki	1949	1949
Wakasegawa Taiji	1	1920	Amagasaki, Hyogo	1950	1950
Shimizugawa Akio	3	1925	Akashi, Hyogo	1951	1958*
Wakabayama Sadao	1	1922	Yame, Fukuoka	1951	1951
Kuninobori Kunio	2	1925	Itabashi, Tokyo	1954	1954*
Miyanishiki Hiroshi	1	1927	Miyako, Iwate	1955	1955
Otachi Danemon	1	1923	Kaho, Fukuoka	1955	1955
Naruyama Akira	1	1931	Sumoto, Hyogo	1956	1956
Wakanoumi Masateru	3	1931	Ikawa, Akita	1957	1960*
Yoshakayama Tsunenori	1	1931	Shingu, Fukuoka	1958	1958
Ōhikari Sadayuki	2	1927	Kamiiso, Hokkaido	1958	1958*
Shionishiki Yoshiaki	1	1924	Shimomashiki, Kumamoto	1959	1959
**Fujinishiki Akira**	10	1937	Kofu, Yamanashi	1960	1967*
Toyokuni Susumu	1	1937	Nakatsu, Oita	1962	1962
Kanenohana Takeo	1	1936	Tsurumi-ku, Yokohama	1962	1962
Hirokawa Taizo	1	1937	Yokosuka, Kanagawa	1964	1964
Wakanami Jun	3	1941	Iwai, Ibaraki	1964	1971*
Sawahikari Yukio	1	1941	Tokoro, Hokkaido	1964	1964
Futagodake Takeshi	3	1943	Kanagi, Aomori	1967	1968*
Wakafutase Tadayuki	3	1942	Minami-ku, Nagoya	1968	1969*
Ryūko Seihō	4	1941	Ota, Tokyo	1970	1975*
Yutakayama Hiromitsu	4	1947	Hiraka, Akita	1972	1977*
Haguroiwa Tomomi	1	1946	Nobeoka, Miyazaki	1973	1973
Ōnishiki Ittetsu	1	1953	Hamochi, Niigata	1973	1973
Wakajishi Shigenori	1	1948	Kamikita, Aomori	1976	1976
Ōshio Kenji	1	1948	Kitakyushu, Fukuoka	1978	1978
Banryūyama Takaharu	1	1951	Tatsuno, Hyogo	1978	1978
Aobayama Hirotoshi	3	1950	Osato, Miyagi	1979	1980*
Tamakiyama Masanori	1	1951	Maebaru, Fukuoka	1979	1979
Futatsuryū Jun'ichi	1	1950	Muroran, Hokkaido	1979	1979
Kurosegawa Kuniyuki	2	1951	Higashimurayama, Tokyo	1980	1982*
Sadanoumi Kōji	4	1956	Sakai, Osaka	1982	1984*
Ōyutaka Masachika	1	1955	Horinouchi, Niigata	1983	1983
Daitetsu Tadamitsu	1	1956	Ono, Fukui	1987	1987
Hananoumi Ken	2	1960	Ikawa, Akita	1987	1989*
Ryōgoku Kajinosuke IV	4	1962	Nagasaki, Nagasaki	1987	1990*
Maenoshin Yasuo	1	1961	Chikuho, Fukuoka	1987	1987
Tamaryū Daizō	1	1954	Nagasaki, Nagasaki	1987	1987
Jingaku Takashi	2	1959	Shibushi, Kagoshima	1987	1990*
Misugisato Kōji	3	1962	Shigaraki, Shiga	1989	1992*
Itai Keisuke	1	1956	Usuki, Oita	1989	1989
Takanofuji Tadao	1	1963	Ota, Tokyo	1990	1990
Takamisugi Takakatsu	2	1961	Kawasaki, Kanagawa	1991	1993*
Tomoefuji Toshihide	1	1971	Kazuno, Akita	1992	1992
Kyokudōzan Kazuyasu	3	1964	Tokunoshima, Kagoshima	1992	1993*
Daishōhō Masami	3	1967	Toyohira-ku, Sapporo	1993	1996*
Tomonohana Shinya	1	1964	Yatsushiro, Kumamoto	1994	1994
Daizen Takahiro	1	1964	Naniwa-ku, Osaka	1994	1994
Hamanoshima Keishi	1	1970	Uto, Kumamoto	1994	1994
Mainoumi Shūhei	1	1968	Ajigasawa, Aomori	1994	1994
Naminohana Kazutaka	1	1969	Namioka, Aomori	1995	1995
Kenkō Satoshi	2	1967	Moriguchi, Osaka	1995	1995*
Kotoinazuma Yoshihiro	1	1962	Niiharu, Gunma	1995	1995
Asahiyutaka Katsuteru	3	1968	Kasugai, Aichi	1996	1996*
Kyokushūzan Noboru	1	1973	Ulaanbaatar, Mongolia	1997	1997
Oginishiki Yasutoshi	1	1971	Ichikawa, Chiba	1997	1997
Chiyotenzan Daihachirō	1	1976	Higashisumiyoshi-ku, Osaka	1999	1999
Tochinohana Hitoshi	1	1973	Kuji, Iwate	2000	2000
Wakanoyama Hiroshi	1	1972	Gobo, Wakayama	2001	2001
Kaihō Ryōji	1	1973	Fukaura, Aomori	2001	2001
Takamisakari Seiken	2	1976	Itayanagi, Aomori	2002	2003*
Tōki Susumu	1	1974	Ichikawa, Chiba	2003	2003
Iwakiyama Ryūta	2	1976	Hirosaki, Aomori	2003	2005*
Shimotori Norio	1	1978	Arai, Niigata	2004	2004
Kakizoe Tōru	1	1978	Usa, Oita	2004	2004
Futen'ō Izumi	1	1980	Tamana, Kumamoto	2005	2005
Rohō Yukio	3	1980	Vladikavkaz, Russia	2006	2007*
Kokkai Futoshi	2	1981	Tbilisi, Georgia	2006	2006
Tokitenkū Yoshiaki	3	1979	Altanbulag, Mongolia	2007	2013*
Hakuba Takeshi	1	1983	Ulaanbaatar, Mongolia	2010	2010
Hōmashō Noriyuki	3	1981	Shimonoseki, Yamaguchi	2011	2012*
Wakakōyū Masaya	1	1984	Funabashi, Chiba	2012	2012
Gagamaru Masaru	1	1987	Tbilisi, Georgia	2012	2012
Shōhōzan Yūya	5	1984	Chikujo, Fukuoka	2013	2018*
Chiyoōtori Yūki	1	1992	Shibushi, Kagoshima	2014	2014
Chiyotairyū Hidemasa	2	1988	Arakawa, Tokyo	2014	2018*
Jōkōryū Takayuki	1	1988	Kita, Tokyo	2014	2014
Ōnoshō Fumiya	2	1996	Nakadomari, Aomori	2017	2018
Endō Shōta	5	1990	Anamizu, Ishikawa	2018	2020*
Hokutofuji Daiki	4	1992	Tokorozawa, Saitama	2019	2024*
Ryūden Gōshi	1	1990	Kofu, Yamanashi	2019	2019
Tobizaru Masaya	3	1992	Edogawa, Tokyo	2022	2023*
Nishikigi Tetsuya	2	1990	Morioka, Iwate	2023	2024*
Ura Kazuki	1	1992	Neyagawa, Osaka	2024	2024
Hiradoumi Yūki	2	2000	Hirado, Nagasaki	2024	2024
Ōshōma Degi	1	1997	Töv Province, Mongolia	2025	2025
Yoshinofuji Naoya	2	2001	Uto, Kumamoto	2026	active*
Hakunofuji Tetsuya	1	2003	Kurayoshi, Tottori	2026	2026
Churanoumi Yoshihisa	1	1993	Uruma, Okinawa	2026	active

* Wrestler held the rank on at least two occasions.

== Trivia ==
The longest-serving komusubi of modern times, who did not achieve further promotion, has been Fujinishiki Akira who held the rank for 10 basho at seven occasions within six years, including the rare feats of a consecutive komusubi appearance and a three-peat at that rank. (Many others have held the rank for longer but were ultimately promoted further.)

Furthermore, no other komusubi failing to make sekiwake has ever managed to win a yusho. (Although there have been additional instances of maegashira ranked wrestlers winning a championship but failing to reach san'yaku.)

Having held a rank of komusubi or sekiwake for at least one tournament will qualify a wrestler to later become a sumo elder (toshiyori), while the many that fail to do so are subject to much stricter criteria.

== See also ==
- Glossary of sumo terms
- List of active sumo wrestlers
- List of past sumo wrestlers
- List of sumo top division champions
- List of sumo top division runners-up
- List of yokozuna
- List of ōzeki
- List of sekiwake
- Makuuchi
