= Sawahikari Yukio =

Japanese sumo wrestler

Personal information
- Native name: 沢光 幸夫
- Born: Yukio Sawamukai; 18 June 1941 (age 85) Saroma, Hokkaidō, Japan
- Height: 1.73 m (5 ft 8 in)
- Weight: 105 kg (231 lb)

Sport
- Sport: Sumo
- Retired: November, 1964
- Heya: Tokitsukaze
- Record: 254-211-24
- Debut: September, 1956
- Highest rank: Komusubi (July, 1964)
- Championships: 1 (Jūryō)
- Special Prizes: Outstanding Performance (1); Fighting Spirit (1)
- Gold Stars: 1 (Tochinoumi)
- Updated on Sep. 2012

Sawahikari Yukio (born 18 June 1941 as Yukio Sawamukai) is a former sumo wrestler from Saroma, Hokkaidō, Japan. He made his professional debut in September 1956 and reached the top division in November 1963. His highest rank was komusubi. He left the sumo world upon retirement from active competition in November 1964.

== Career record ==
- The Kyushu tournament was first held in 1957, and the Nagoya tournament in 1958.

Sawahikari Yukio
| Year | January Hatsu basho, Tokyo | March Haru basho, Osaka | May Natsu basho, Tokyo | July Nagoya basho, Nagoya | September Aki basho, Tokyo | November Kyūshū basho, Fukuoka |
|---|---|---|---|---|---|---|
| 1956 | x | x | x | Not held | (Maezumo) | Not held |
| 1957 | Shinjo; 3–1 | East Jonidan #112; 4–4 | West Jonidan #89; 6–2 | Not held | East Jonidan #33; 5–3 | West Sandanme #91; 3–5 |
| 1958 | West Sandanme #98; 4–4 | West Sandanme #89; 4–4 | West Sandanme #86; 7–1 | East Sandanme #41; 4–4 | West Sandanme #36; 4–4 | West Sandanme #33; 6–2 |
| 1959 | West Sandanme #17; 3–5 | East Sandanme #23; 5–3 | West Sandanme #8; 6–2 | West Makushita #74; 5–3 | West Makushita #66; 5–3 | West Makushita #50; 5–3 |
| 1960 | East Makushita #41; 0–3–5 | West Makushita #52; 2–6 | West Makushita #61; 7–1 | East Makushita #41; 4–3 | West Makushita #35; 3–4 | East Makushita #38; 6–1 |
| 1961 | East Makushita #23; 5–2 | East Makushita #14; 5–2 | West Makushita #8; 3–4 | West Makushita #10; 4–3 | East Makushita #6; 4–3 | West Makushita #3; 5–2 |
| 1962 | West Jūryō #18; 10–5 | East Jūryō #8; 7–8 | West Jūryō #9; 8–7 | West Jūryō #5; 7–8 | West Jūryō #6; 7–8 | West Jūryō #7; 7–4–4 |
| 1963 | West Jūryō #7; 7–8 | East Jūryō #8; 7–8 | West Jūryō #8; 8–7 | East Jūryō #8; 8–7 | West Jūryō #5; 12–3; Champion | East Maegashira #12; 10–5; F |
| 1964 | West Maegashira #5; 5–10 | West Maegashira #10; 9–6 | East Maegashira #4; 8–7; O★ | East Komusubi #1; 2–13 | East Maegashira #7; 5–10 | West Maegashira #14; Retired; 0–0–15 |
Record given as wins–losses–absences Top division champion Top division runner-up Retired Lower divisions Non-participation Sanshō key: F=Fighting spirit; O=Outstanding performance; T=Technique Also shown: ★=Kinboshi; P=Playoff(s); Divisions: Makuuchi — Jūryō — Makushita — Sandanme — Jonidan — Jonokuchi Makuuchi ranks: Yokozuna — Ōzeki — Sekiwake — Komusubi — Maegashira

== See also ==
- Glossary of sumo terms
- List of past sumo wrestlers
- List of sumo tournament second division champions
- List of komusubi
