= Toyokuni Susumu =

Retired Japanese sumo wrestler (born 1937)

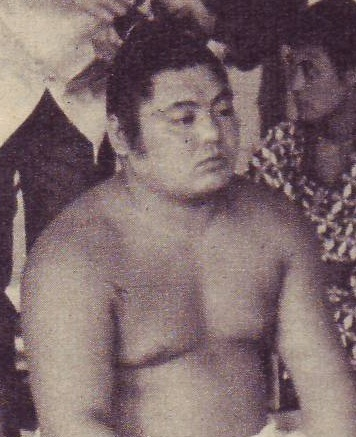

Personal information
- Native name: 豊國 範
- Born: Susumu Otsuka; 30 November 1937 (age 88) Nakatsu, Ōita, Japan
- Height: 1.76 m (5 ft 9 1/2 in)
- Weight: 131 kg (289 lb)

Sport
- Sport: Sumo
- Retired: January, 1968
- Heya: Tokitsukaze
- Record: 318-336-20
- Debut: May, 1960
- Highest rank: Komusubi (May, 1962)
- Championships: 1 (Jūryō); 1 (Makushita)
- Special Prizes: Fighting Spirit (1); Technique (1)
- Gold Stars: 7 Taihō (3); Sadanoyama (2); Kashiwado; Tochinoumi
- Updated on August 2012

Toyokuni Susumu (born 30 November 1937 as Susumu Otsuka) is a former sumo wrestler from Nakatsu, Ōita, Japan. He made his professional debut in May 1960, and reached the top division in November 1961. He earned seven gold stars against grand champion yokozuna in the course of his career. His highest rank was komusubi. He retired in January 1968.

== Career record ==
Toyokuni Susumu
Year	January Hatsu basho, Tokyo	March Haru basho, Osaka	May Natsu basho, Tokyo	July Nagoya basho, Nagoya	September Aki basho, Tokyo	November Kyūshū basho, Fukuoka
1960	x	x	Makushita tsukedashi #85; 8–0; Champion	West Makushita #9; 5–2	East Makushita #4; 5–2	West Makushita #1; 5–2
1961	East Jūryō #18; 10–5	West Jūryō #8; 6–9	East Jūryō #12; 9–6	West Jūryō #6; 9–6	East Jūryō #3; 12–3–P; Champion	West Maegashira #9; 8–7
1962	West Maegashira #7; 11–4	West Maegashira #2; 9–6; F	East Komusubi #2; 4–11	West Maegashira #6; 9–6	East Maegashira #2; 5–10	East Maegashira #7; 4–11
1963	East Maegashira #13; 7–8	West Maegashira #13; 8–7	West Maegashira #10; 6–6–3	East Maegashira #14; 7–8	East Maegashira #15; 11–4	East Maegashira #4; 7–8 ★
1964	East Maegashira #5; 6–9	East Maegashira #8; 8–7	West Maegashira #4; 4–11	East Maegashira #11; 11–4	East Maegashira #2; 4–11 ★★	West Maegashira #9; 6–9
1965	East Maegashira #12; 8–7	West Maegashira #8; 10–5	Maegashira #2; 3–12 ★	West Maegashira #8; 9–6	West Maegashira #4; 9–6	West Maegashira #1; 6–9
1966	East Maegashira #4; 8–7	East Maegashira #3; 4–11 ★	West Maegashira #5; 10–5	West Maegashira #1; 0–5–10	West Maegashira #9; 10–5	West Maegashira #1; 5–10 ★
1967	East Maegashira #4; 9–6; T	East Maegashira #1; 3–12	East Maegashira #9; 10–5	East Maegashira #2; 5–10 ★	East Maegashira #7; 3–12	East Maegashira #12; 2–13
1968	West Jūryō #5; Retired; 0–8–7	x	x	x	x	x
Record given as wins–losses–absences Top division champion Top division runner-up Retired Lower divisions Non-participation Sanshō key: F=Fighting spirit; O=Outstanding performance; T=Technique Also shown: ★=Kinboshi; P=Playoff(s); Divisions: Makuuchi — Jūryō — Makushita — Sandanme — Jonidan — Jonokuchi Makuuchi ranks: Yokozuna — Ōzeki — Sekiwake — Komusubi — Maegashira

== See also ==
- Glossary of sumo terms
- List of past sumo wrestlers
- List of sumo tournament second division champions
- List of komusubi
