= Aobayama Hirotoshi =

Japanese sumo wrestler (1950–1997)

Personal information
- Native name: 青葉山 弘年
- Born: Koichi Takahashi; April 3, 1950 Ōsato, Miyagi, Japan
- Died: September 24, 1997 (aged 47)
- Height: 1.87 m (6 ft 1 1/2 in)
- Weight: 132 kg (291 lb)

Sport
- Sport: Sumo
- Retired: September, 1982
- Heya: Kise
- Record: 490-490-5
- Debut: November, 1968
- Highest rank: Komusubi (January, 1979)
- Elder name: Asakayama
- Championships: 1 (Jūryō); 1 (Sandanme); 1 (Jonokuchi)
- Special Prizes: Fighting Spirit (2); Technique (1)
- Updated on June 2020

Aobayama Hirotoshi (born Koichi Takahashi; April 3, 1950 – September 24, 1997) was a former sumo wrestler from Ōsato, Miyagi, Japan. He made his professional debut in November 1968, won the championship in his only sixth-division tournament, and another in November 1970, winning out in a rare nine-way playoff in forth division. He reached the top division in November 1975 after winning the second division prior. His highest rank was komusubi. He retired in September 1982 and became an elder in the Japan Sumo Association under the name Asakayama (now held by ex-ōzeki Kaiō). He died while active as a coach at Kise stable.

== Career record ==
Aobayama Hirotoshi
Year	January Hatsu basho, Tokyo	March Haru basho, Osaka	May Natsu basho, Tokyo	July Nagoya basho, Nagoya	September Aki basho, Tokyo	November Kyūshū basho, Fukuoka
1968	x	x	x	x	x	(Maezumo)
1969	West Jonokuchi #7; 6–1; Champion	West Jonidan #33; 5–2	West Jonidan #2; 4–3	East Sandanme #83; 4–3	East Sandanme #7; 5–2	West Sandanme #35; 5–2
1970	West Sandanme #8; 4–3	East Makushita #57; 5–2	East Makushita #40; 4–3	East Makushita #32; 2–5	West Makushita #51; 2–5	West Sandanme #8; 6–1–PPPP; Champion
1971	West Makushita #40; 4–3	East Makushita #33; 5–2	West Makushita #18; 4–3	East Makushita #13; 4–3	West Makushita #12; 4–3	East Makushita #9; 6–1
1972	West Makushita #1; 4–3	East Makushita #1; 4–3	East Makushita #1; 3–4	East Makushita #3; 3–4	West Makushita #7; 3–4	West Makushita #11; 5–2
1973	East Makushita #6; 3–4	East Makushita #10; 4–3	West Makushita #7; 3–4	East Makushita #11; 6–1–PP	East Makushita #3; 4–3	West Makushita #1; 3–4
1974	West Makushita #5; 4–3	East Makushita #4; 5–2	West Jūryō #12; 9–6	East Jūryō #5; 6–9	East Jūryō #8; 8–7	East Jūryō #6; 6–9
1975	East Jūryō #11; 9–6	West Jūryō #6; 9–6	West Jūryō #2; 5–10	West Jūryō #8; 9–6	East Jūryō #4; 13–2; Champion	East Maegashira #11; 10–5; F
1976	East Maegashira #4; 6–9	West Maegashira #8; 6–9	East Maegashira #12; 4–11	East Jūryō #5; 6–9	West Jūryō #10; 8–7	West Jūryō #6; 8–7
1977	East Jūryō #4; 8–7	West Jūryō #2; 8–7	East Jūryō #1; 10–5	East Maegashira #10; 9–6	West Maegashira #5; 8–7	East Maegashira #2; 5–10
1978	West Maegashira #7; 9–6	East Maegashira #2; 5–10	West Maegashira #7; 9–6	East Maegashira #2; 5–10	East Maegashira #6; 8–7	West Maegashira #4; 9–6; T
1979	East Komusubi #1; 4–11	East Maegashira #6; 10–5	West Komusubi #1; 5–10	West Maegashira #3; 5–10	West Maegashira #9; 8–7	East Maegashira #6; 6–9
1980	West Maegashira #9; 8–7	East Maegashira #4; 5–10	West Maegashira #9; 9–6	West Maegashira #3; 4–11	East Maegashira #10; 11–4; F	West Komusubi #1; 6–9
1981	West Maegashira #2; 5–10	West Maegashira #7; 6–9	East Maegashira #10; 9–6	East Maegashira #7; 4–11	East Maegashira #12; 8–7	West Maegashira #8; 3–12
1982	West Jūryō #5; 8–7	East Jūryō #3; 7–8	East Jūryō #5; 6–4–5	East Jūryō #6; 5–10	West Jūryō #11; Retired; 1–9–0	x
Record given as wins–losses–absences Top division champion Top division runner-up Retired Lower divisions Non-participation Sanshō key: F=Fighting spirit; O=Outstanding performance; T=Technique Also shown: ★=Kinboshi; P=Playoff(s); Divisions: Makuuchi — Jūryō — Makushita — Sandanme — Jonidan — Jonokuchi Makuuchi ranks: Yokozuna — Ōzeki — Sekiwake — Komusubi — Maegashira

== See also ==
- Glossary of sumo terms
- List of past sumo wrestlers
- List of sumo tournament second division champions
- List of komusubi
