= Kiyonomori Masao =

Japanese sumo wrestler (1935–2019)

Personal information
- Native name: 清の盛 政夫
- Born: Masao Sasaki; April 8, 1935 Ōmori, Akita, Japan
- Died: April 20, 2019 (aged 84)
- Height: 1.83 m (6 ft 0 in)
- Weight: 92 kg (203 lb)

Sport
- Sport: Sumo
- Retired: May, 1967
- Heya: Isegahama
- Record: 519-504-7-1 (draw)
- Debut: January, 1953
- Highest rank: Maegashira 9 (May, 1960)
- Elder name: Kise
- Championships: 2 (Jūryō)
- Updated on June 2020

Kiyonomori Masao (8 April 1935 – 20 April 2019, real name Masao Sasaki) was a sumo wrestler from Ōmori, Akita, Japan. He made his professional debut in January 1953 and reached the top division in March 1959. His highest rank was maegashira 9. Upon retirement from active competition he became an elder in the Japan Sumo Association and took charge of Kise stable from his father-in-law Katsuragawa. He reached the Sumo Association's mandatory retirement age in April 2000. He died of pneumonia in April 2019 at the age of 84.

== Career record ==
- The Kyushu tournament was first held in 1957, and the Nagoya tournament in 1958.

Kiyonomori Masao
Year	January Hatsu basho, Tokyo	March Haru basho, Osaka	May Natsu basho, Tokyo	July Nagoya basho, Nagoya	September Aki basho, Tokyo	November Kyūshū basho, Fukuoka
1953	Shinjo; 2–1	East Jonidan #31; 5–3	West Jonidan #7; 4–4	Not held	West Sandanme #62; 5–3	Not held
1954	West Sandanme #47; 5–3	East Sandanme #29; 4–4	East Sandanme #25; 7–1	Not held	East Makushita #47; 5–3	Not held
1955	East Makushita #36; 5–3	West Makushita #29; 3–5	East Makushita #33; 3–5	Not held	West Makushita #34; 5–3	Not held
1956	East Makushita #24; 7–1	West Makushita #5; 3–5	East Makushita #9; 5–3	Not held	East Makushita #8; 4–4	Not held
1957	East Makushita #7; 4–4	East Makushita #5; 6–2	West Jūryō #22; 8–7	Not held	East Jūryō #18; 7–8	West Jūryō #19; 6–9
1958	West Jūryō #24; 9–6	West Jūryō #18; 11–4	West Jūryō #9; 8–7	West Jūryō #7; 8–7	East Jūryō #5; 6–9	East Jūryō #11; 10–5
1959	East Jūryō #4; 11–4	West Maegashira #17; 4–11	East Jūryō #5; 8–7	West Jūryō #4; 11–4	East Maegashira #19; 7–8	East Jūryō #1; 7–8
1960	West Jūryō #2; 9–6	East Maegashira #14; 10–5	West Maegashira #9; 4–11	West Maegashira #14; 8–7	East Maegashira #9; 6–9	East Maegashira #12; 6–9
1961	West Jūryō #1; 9–6	East Maegashira #14; 6–9	East Jūryō #1; 12–3; Champion	East Maegashira #10; 6–9	West Maegashira #10; 6–9	East Maegashira #13; 6–9
1962	West Jūryō #1; 11–4	East Maegashira #11; 6–9	West Maegashira #13; 6–9	East Jūryō #1; 7–8	West Jūryō #2; 9–6	West Maegashira #14; 7–8
1963	West Maegashira #15; 8–7	West Maegashira #11; 6–9	East Maegashira #14; 8–7	West Maegashira #13; 5–10	East Jūryō #3; 11–4	West Maegashira #11; 0–15
1964	East Jūryō #6; 5–10	West Jūryō #12; 8–7	West Jūryō #10; 9–6	West Jūryō #8; 11–4	East Jūryō #4; 7–8	West Jūryō #4; 6–8–1draw
1965	West Jūryō #5; 6–9	West Jūryō #7; 7–8	West Jūryō #8; 13–2; Champion	East Jūryō #1; 4–11	East Jūryō #9; 8–7	West Jūryō #5; 9–6
1966	West Jūryō #3; 8–7	East Jūryō #1; 5–10	West Jūryō #6; 7–8	East Jūryō #7; 6–9	West Jūryō #10; 7–8	West Jūryō #10; 8–7
1967	West Jūryō #4; 5–10	West Jūryō #7; 5–10	East Makushita #6; Retired; 0–0–7	x	x	x
Record given as wins–losses–absences Top division champion Top division runner-up Retired Lower divisions Non-participation Sanshō key: F=Fighting spirit; O=Outstanding performance; T=Technique Also shown: ★=Kinboshi; P=Playoff(s); Divisions: Makuuchi — Jūryō — Makushita — Sandanme — Jonidan — Jonokuchi Makuuchi ranks: Yokozuna — Ōzeki — Sekiwake — Komusubi — Maegashira

== See also ==
- Glossary of sumo terms
- List of past sumo wrestlers
- List of sumo tournament second division champions
