= Kanenohana Takeo =

Japanese sumo wrestler

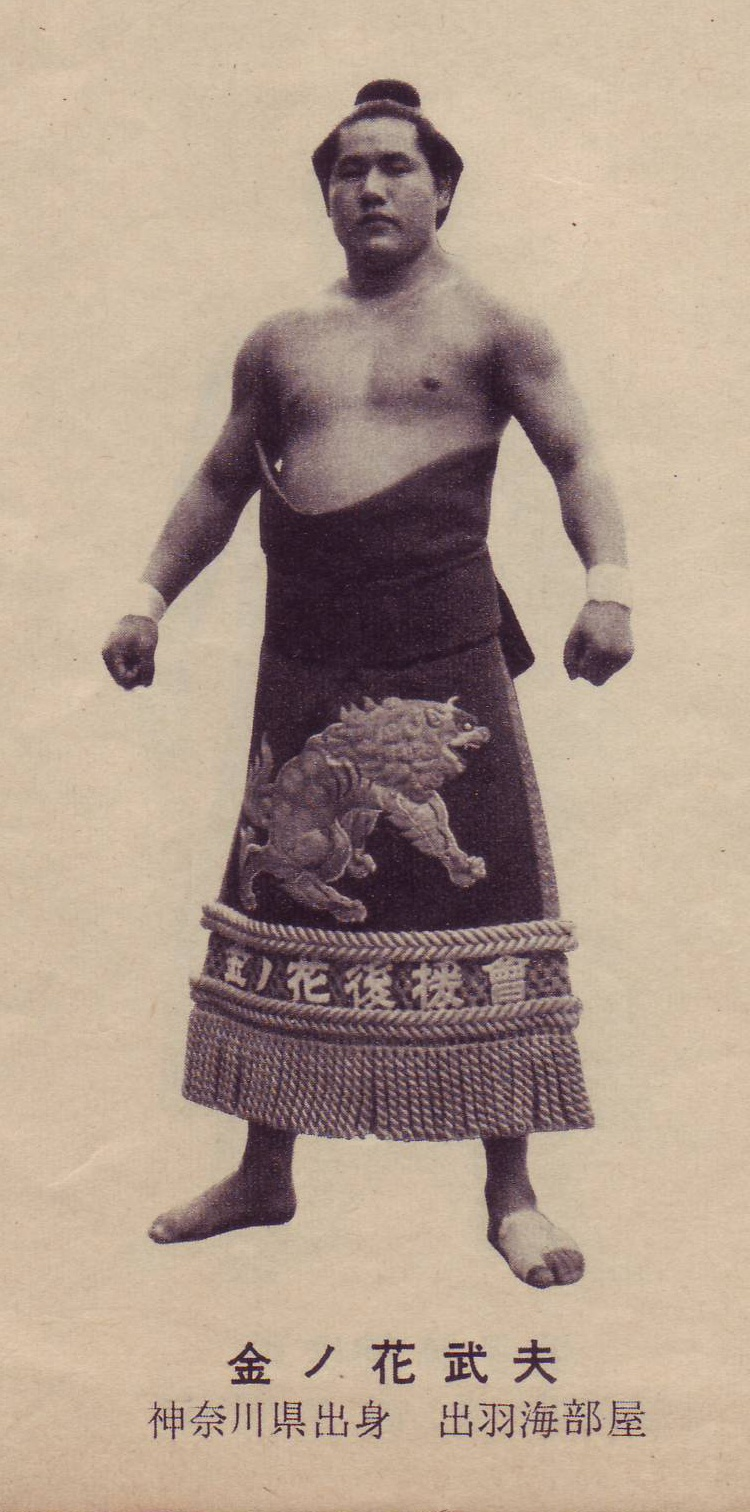

Personal information
- Native name: 金乃花 武夫
- Born: Takeo Kanai; 11 October 1936 (age 90) Tsurumi-ku, Yokohama, Kanagawa, Japan
- Height: 1.81 m (5 ft 11 1/2 in)
- Weight: 119 kg (262 lb)

Sport
- Sport: Sumo
- Retired: September, 1967
- Heya: Dewanoumi
- Record: 536-511-27
- Debut: May, 1952
- Highest rank: Komusubi (September, 1962)
- Championships: 1 (Jūryō)
- Gold Stars: 1 (Taihō)
- Updated on Sep. 2012

Kanenohana Takeo (born 11 October 1936 as Takeo Kanai) is a former sumo wrestler from Tsurumi, Yokohama, Kanagawa, Japan. He made his professional debut in May 1952 and reached the top division in March 1958. His highest rank was komusubi. He left the sumo world upon retirement from active competition in September 1967.

== Pre-modern career record ==
- In 1953 the New Year tournament was begun and the Spring tournament began to be held in Osaka.

Kanenohana Takeo
-	Spring Haru basho, Tokyo	Summer Natsu basho, Tokyo	Autumn Aki basho, Tokyo
1952	x	(Maezumo)	West Jonidan #34; 5–3
Record given as wins–losses–absences Top division champion Top division runner-up Retired Lower divisions Non-participation Sanshō key: F=Fighting spirit; O=Outstanding performance; T=Technique Also shown: ★=Kinboshi; P=Playoff(s); Divisions: Makuuchi — Jūryō — Makushita — Sandanme — Jonidan — Jonokuchi Makuuchi ranks: Yokozuna — Ōzeki — Sekiwake — Komusubi — Maegashira

-	New Year Hatsu basho, Tokyo	Spring Haru basho, Osaka	Summer Natsu basho, Tokyo	Autumn Aki basho, Tokyo
1953	East Jonidan #8; 3–5	West Jonidan #9; 6–2	East Sandanme #48; 5–3	West Sandanme #35; 3–5
1954	East Sandanme #38; 5–3	East Sandanme #20; 3–5	East Sandanme #24; 5–3	West Sandanme #7; 6–2
1955	East Makushita #41; 4–4	West Makushita #39; 4–4	East Makushita #37; 5–3	West Makushita #28; 5–3
1956	East Makushita #20; 3–5	West Makushita #23; 6–2	East Makushita #15; 5–3	West Makushita #9; 4–4
Record given as wins–losses–absences Top division champion Top division runner-up Retired Lower divisions Non-participation Sanshō key: F=Fighting spirit; O=Outstanding performance; T=Technique Also shown: ★=Kinboshi; P=Playoff(s); Divisions: Makuuchi — Jūryō — Makushita — Sandanme — Jonidan — Jonokuchi Makuuchi ranks: Yokozuna — Ōzeki — Sekiwake — Komusubi — Maegashira

== Modern career record ==
- Since the addition of the Kyushu tournament in 1957 and the Nagoya tournament in 1958, the yearly schedule has remained unchanged.

Year	January Hatsu basho, Tokyo	March Haru basho, Osaka	May Natsu basho, Tokyo	July Nagoya basho, Nagoya	September Aki basho, Tokyo	November Kyūshū basho, Fukuoka
1957	East Makushita #8; 5–3	East Makushita #3; 5–3	West Jūryō #23; 10–5	Not held	West Jūryō #13; 12–3	East Jūryō #5; 6–5–4
1958	East Jūryō #9; 11–4	West Maegashira #22; 5–10	East Jūryō #3; 10–5	East Maegashira #19; 11–4	West Maegashira #13; 7–8	West Maegashira #14; 3–12
1959	West Jūryō #2; 7–8	West Jūryō #3; 9–6	East Jūryō #2; 9–6	West Maegashira #19; 10–5	East Maegashira #13; 9–6	East Maegashira #8; 6–9
1960	West Maegashira #11; 6–9	East Maegashira #13; 8–7	East Maegashira #10; 6–9	East Maegashira #12; 6–9	East Maegashira #15; 6–9	West Jūryō #1; 8–7
1961	East Jūryō #1; 10–5	East Maegashira #13; 8–7	East Maegashira #10; 10–5	East Maegashira #4; 3–4–8	West Maegashira #8; 8–7	East Maegashira #6; 9–6
1962	West Maegashira #2; 6–9 ★	East Maegashira #6; 8–7	West Maegashira #2; 6–9	East Maegashira #6; 10–5	West Komusubi #1; 4–11	West Maegashira #5; 6–9
1963	West Maegashira #9; 8–7	East Maegashira #5; 5–10	West Maegashira #8; 9–6	West Maegashira #4; 7–8	East Maegashira #5; 6–9	West Maegashira #8; 6–9
1964	West Maegashira #12; 8–7	West Maegashira #11; 7–8	West Maegashira #12; 8–7	East Maegashira #9; 9–6	West Maegashira #5; 4–11	West Maegashira #12; 8–7
1965	East Maegashira #8; 9–6	West Maegashira #2; 5–10	East Maegashira #5; 6–9	East Maegashira #7; 5–10	West Maegashira #12; 3–12	East Jūryō #4; 8–7
1966	East Jūryō #4; 7–8	East Jūryō #5; 12–3	East Maegashira #15; 6–9	East Jūryō #1; 2–5–8	East Jūryō #14; 10–5	East Jūryō #5; 13–2; Champion
1967	West Maegashira #14; 7–8	East Jūryō #1; 6–9	East Jūryō #10; 8–7	West Jūryō #9; 4–11	East Makushita #1; Retired; 0–0–7	x
Record given as wins–losses–absences Top division champion Top division runner-up Retired Lower divisions Non-participation Sanshō key: F=Fighting spirit; O=Outstanding performance; T=Technique Also shown: ★=Kinboshi; P=Playoff(s); Divisions: Makuuchi — Jūryō — Makushita — Sandanme — Jonidan — Jonokuchi Makuuchi ranks: Yokozuna — Ōzeki — Sekiwake — Komusubi — Maegashira

== See also ==
- Glossary of sumo terms
- List of past sumo wrestlers
- List of sumo tournament second division champions
- List of komusubi
