= Wakajishi Shigenori =

Japanese sumo wrestler

Personal information
- Native name: 若獅子 茂憲
- Born: Kozaburo Wada; 4 May 1948 (age 78) Kamikita, Aomori, Japan
- Height: 1.75 m (5 ft 9 in)
- Weight: 126 kg (278 lb)

Sport
- Sport: Sumo
- Retired: May, 1983
- Heya: Futagoyama
- Record: 678-683-21
- Debut: May, 1964
- Highest rank: Komusubi (September, 1976)
- Elder name: see bio
- Championships: 1 (Jūryō); 1 (Makushita)
- Special Prizes: Fighting Spirit (1)
- Gold Stars: 1 (Kotozakura)
- Updated on June 2020

Wakajishi Shigenori (born 4 May 1948 as Kozaburo Wada) is a former sumo wrestler from Kamikita, Aomori, Japan. He made his professional debut in May 1964 and reached the top division in January 1973. His highest rank was komusubi. Upon retirement from active competition, he became an elder in the Japan Sumo Association. He held many elder names over the years, finding new ones as permanent owners required them. He left the Association in July 1996.

== Career record ==
Wakajishi Shigenori
Year	January Hatsu basho, Tokyo	March Haru basho, Osaka	May Natsu basho, Tokyo	July Nagoya basho, Nagoya	September Aki basho, Tokyo	November Kyūshū basho, Fukuoka
1964	x	x	(Maezumo)	East Jonokuchi #11; 4–3	West Jonidan #104; 6–1	East Jonidan #34; 3–4
1965	East Jonidan #51; 4–3	East Jonidan #23; 5–2	East Sandanme #81; 4–3	West Sandanme #55; 5–2	East Sandanme #21; 3–4	West Sandanme #29; 5–2
1966	West Sandanme #3; 2–5	East Sandanme #25; 5–2	East Makushita #96; 3–4	East Sandanme #5; 6–1	East Makushita #63; 4–3	East Makushita #52; 4–3
1967	West Makushita #48; 5–2	East Makushita #30; 1–6	East Sandanme #11; 6–1	West Makushita #40; 5–2	East Makushita #25; 3–4	East Makushita #28; 3–4
1968	East Makushita #36; 4–3	East Makushita #27; 4–3	East Makushita #23; 2–5	East Makushita #37; 4–3	East Makushita #31; 4–3	East Makushita #24; 3–4
1969	West Makushita #29; 4–3	West Makushita #20; 2–5	West Makushita #31; 5–2	West Makushita #20; 5–2	West Makushita #8; 3–4	East Makushita #12; 5–2
1970	West Makushita #6; 4–3	East Makushita #5; 4–3	East Makushita #3; 4–3	East Makushita #1; 3–4	West Makushita #4; 4–3	East Makushita #2; 4–3
1971	West Jūryō #13; 11–4–P	West Jūryō #3; 7–8	West Jūryō #6; 7–8	West Jūryō #7; 2–4–9)	East Makushita #6; 7–0; Champion	West Jūryō #8; 8–7
1972	West Jūryō #4; 6–9	West Jūryō #6; 6–9	East Jūryō #10; 7–8	East Jūryō #12; 10–5–P	West Jūryō #4; 8–7	East Jūryō #2; 10–5
1973	West Maegashira #12; 5–10	West Jūryō #3; 8–7	East Jūryō #2; 5–10	West Jūryō #7; 9–6	West Jūryō #2; 9–6	East Maegashira #12; 10–5
1974	East Maegashira #3; 6–9 ★	West Maegashira #6; 8–7	East Maegashira #2; 5–10	East Maegashira #7; 8–7	East Maegashira #4; 2–13	East Jūryō #1; 8–7
1975	East Maegashira #13; 9–6	West Maegashira #7; 5–10	East Maegashira #13; 5–10	East Jūryō #3; 9–6	West Maegashira #12; 10–5	East Maegashira #6; 6–9
1976	West Maegashira #9; 6–9	West Maegashira #13; 11–4	West Maegashira #1; 5–10	East Maegashira #6; 11–4; F	East Komusubi #1; 3–12	West Maegashira #7; 6–9
1977	West Maegashira #10; 10–5	East Maegashira #2; 6–9	West Maegashira #5; 7–8	West Maegashira #6; 8–7	West Maegashira #2; 4–11	West Maegashira #9; 7–8
1978	West Maegashira #10; 6–9	West Maegashira #13; 8–7	West Maegashira #10; 1–14	East Jūryō #9; 8–7	East Jūryō #6; 7–8	East Jūryō #9; 7–8
1979	East Jūryō #11; 8–7	West Jūryō #9; 7–8	West Jūryō #11; 9–6	West Jūryō #5; 7–8	East Jūryō #7; 8–7	East Jūryō #6; 7–8
1980	East Jūryō #8; 7–8	East Jūryō #10; 10–5	East Jūryō #3; 4–11	West Jūryō #12; 8–7	West Jūryō #7; 8–7	East Jūryō #4; 8–7
1981	West Jūryō #1; 5–10	East Jūryō #7; 8–7	West Jūryō #2; 8–7	East Maegashira #13; 6–9	East Jūryō #4; 8–7	East Jūryō #2; 11–4; Champion
1982	West Maegashira #11; 6–9	East Maegashira #14; 6–9	West Jūryō #2; 9–6	West Maegashira #14; 4–8–3	West Jūryō #5; 6–9	East Jūryō #9; 9–6
1983	East Jūryō #2; 5–10	West Jūryō #9; 5–8–2	East Makushita #2; Retired; 0–0–7	x	x	x
Record given as wins–losses–absences Top division champion Top division runner-up Retired Lower divisions Non-participation Sanshō key: F=Fighting spirit; O=Outstanding performance; T=Technique Also shown: ★=Kinboshi; P=Playoff(s); Divisions: Makuuchi — Jūryō — Makushita — Sandanme — Jonidan — Jonokuchi Makuuchi ranks: Yokozuna — Ōzeki — Sekiwake — Komusubi — Maegashira

== See also ==
- Glossary of sumo terms
- List of past sumo wrestlers
- List of sumo tournament second division champions
- List of komusubi
