= Chikamatsu Shigenori =

Japanese military writer

Chikamatsu Shigenori (近松 茂矩), military writer and tea ceremony enthusiast, was born in Owari Province (now Aichi prefecture) in 1695. His father, Chikamatsu Shigekiyo, was a retainer of the Tokugawa clan in Owari province. At the age of 17, Chikamatsu Shigenori was appointed as a page to the lord of Owari. Six months later the lord died and was replaced by his brother. Shigenori was subsequently demoted and put in charge of the stables and grooms at reduced pay.

Chikamatsu was best known as a writer and his output included one hundred books on military matters including the yokan kajo denmoku kugi the oral traditions of iga and koga, a scroll outlining the skills and tactics of Japan's famed Shinobi (ninja). He is perhaps best remembered, however, for his writing on chanoyu or the Japanese tea ceremony. He completed a text entitled Chanoyu Kojidan (Legends of the Tea Ceremony) by 1739. This consisted of seven volumes with a total of three hundred and five stories and anecdotes. The book was not yet published at the time of his death in 1778. One hundred and twenty nine of the stories from these volumes were selected and posthumously published in 1804 as Chaso Kanwa (Stories from a Tearoom Window). A second edition was published in 1816.

Chikamatsu was known by several other names (this was historically a common Japanese practice) including Hikonoshin, Nankai, and Nogenshi, and Chikamatsu Hikonoshin Fujiwara Shigenori.

== Bibliography ==
- Mori, Toshiko. "Introduction" in Chikamatsu, Shigenori Stories From a Tearoom Window. Tokyo: Charles E. Tuttle Co., 1982.
