= Ōsato, Miyagi =

Ōsato 大郷町
- Town
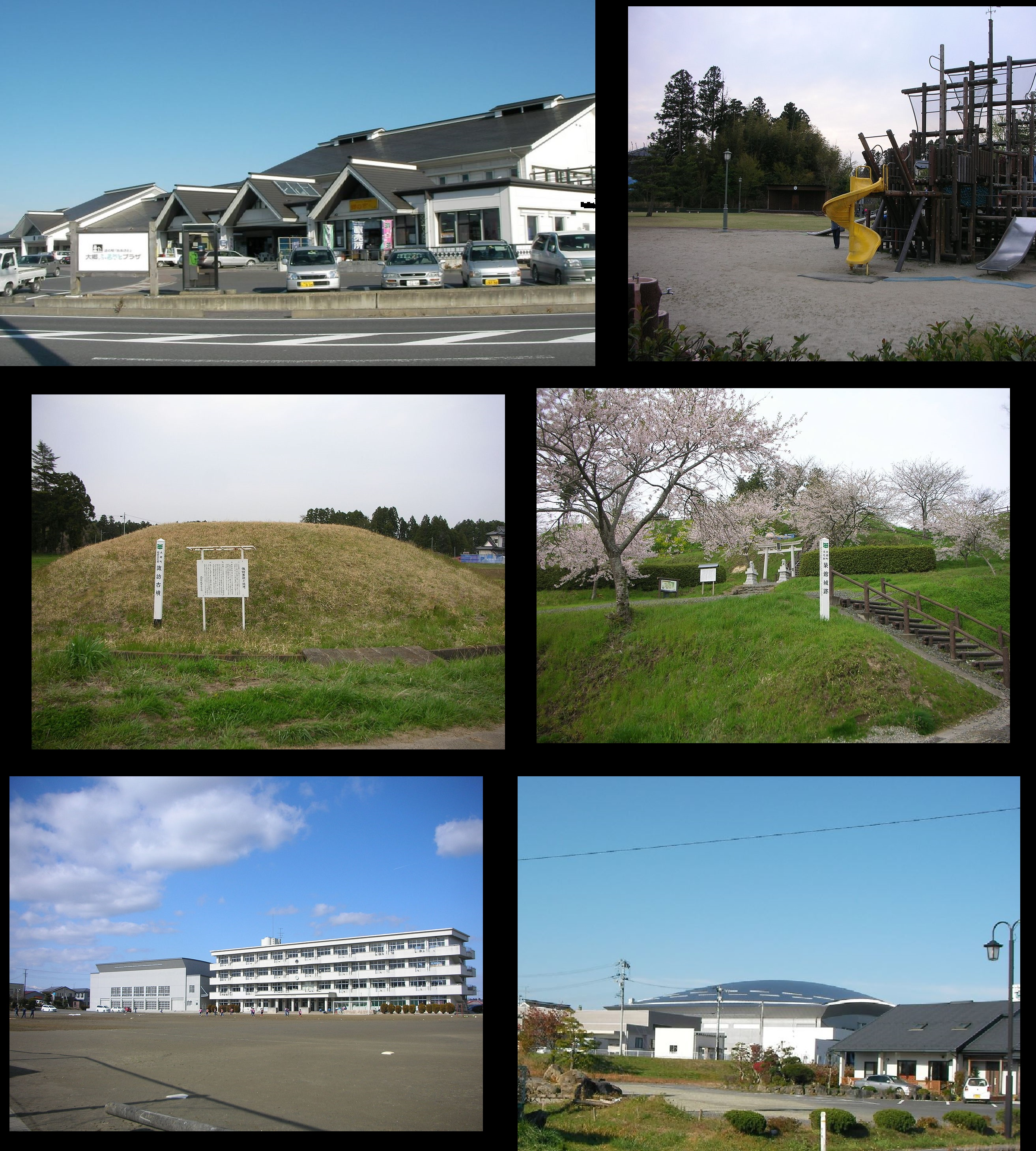
- Ōsato road station - Ōsato Land Suwa Kofun - Tsukidate Castle ruins Ōsato Middle School - Flap Ōsato21

- Flag Seal

- Location of Ōsato in Miyagi Prefecture

- Coordinates: 38°25′27.3″N 141°0′15.9″E
- Country: Japan
- Region: Tōhoku
- Prefecture: Miyagi
- District: Kurokawa

Area
  - Total: 82.01 km^{2} (31.66 sq mi)

Population (31 May 2020)
  - Total: 7,972
  - Density: 97.21/km^{2} (251.8/sq mi)
- Time zone: UTC+9 (Japan Standard Time)
- Tree: Pine
- Flower: Azalea
- Bird: Common cuckoo
- Phone number: 0229-43-2111
- Address: 5-8 Kasukawa Nishinagasaki, Ōsato-chō, Kurokawa-gun, Miyagi-ken 981-3592
- Website: Official website

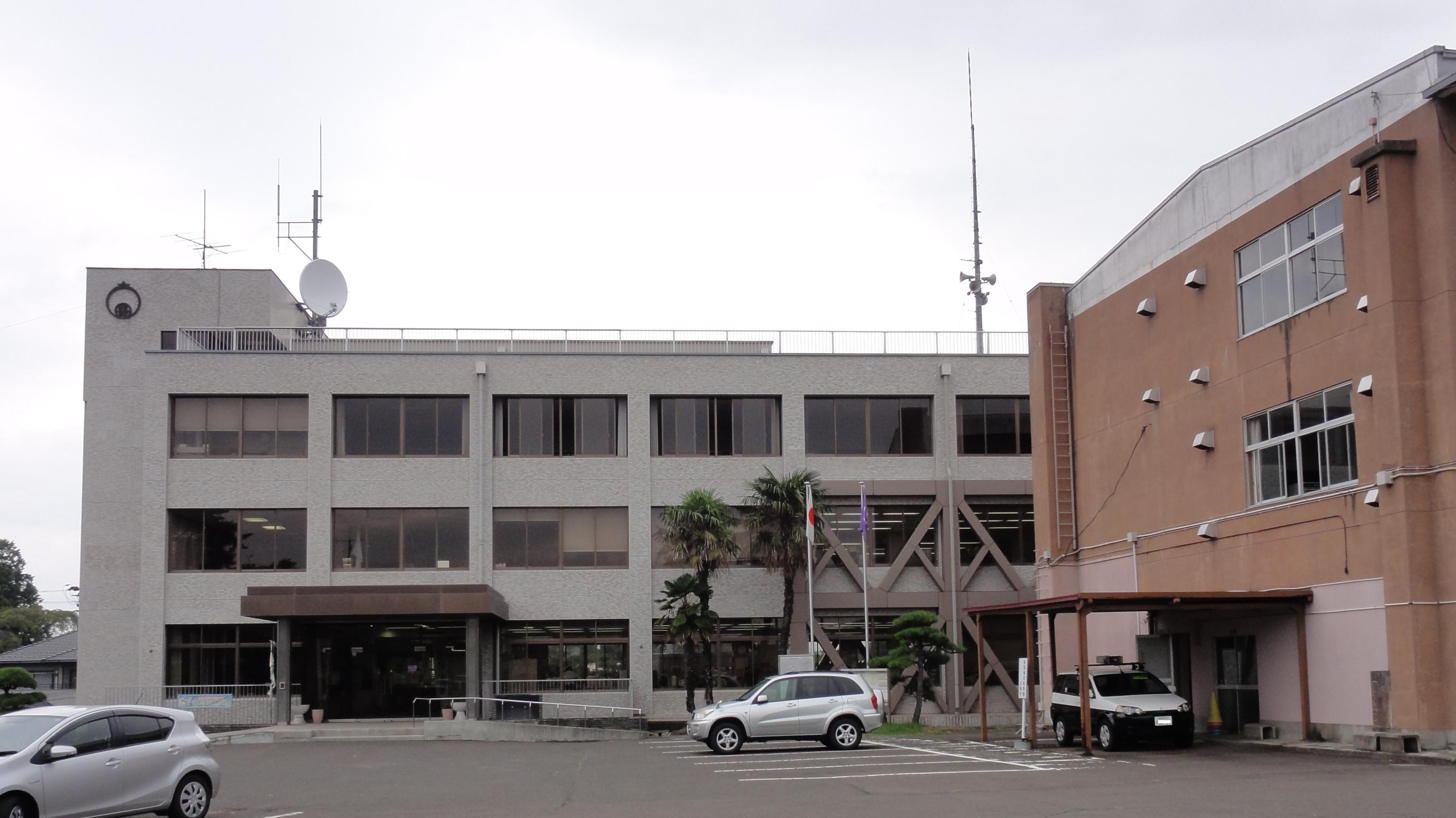
Ōsato town hall

Ōsato (大郷町, Ōsato-chō) is a town located in Miyagi Prefecture, Japan. As of 31 May 2020, the town had an estimated population of 7,972, and a population density of 97 persons per km^{2} in 2813 households. The total area of the town is 82.01 square kilometres (31.66 sq mi).

== Geography ==
Ōsato is located in central Miyagi Prefecture. The Yoshida River runs east to west through the center of the town, and the fields spread along the river. Hills extend from north to south.

=== Neighboring municipalities ===
Miyagi Prefecture

- Matsushima
- Ōhira
- Ōsaki
- Taiwa
- Rifu

=== Climate ===
The town has a climate characterized by cool summers and long cold winters (Köppen climate classification Cfa). The average annual temperature in Ōsato is 11.9 °C. The average annual rainfall is 1225 mm with September as the wettest month. The temperatures are highest on average in August, at around 24.6 °C, and lowest in January, at around 0.4 °C.

== Demographics ==
Per Japanese census data, the population of Ōsato has declined over the past 30 years.

Historical population
Year	Pop.	±%
1920	8,225	—
1930	9,352	+13.7%
1940	10,141	+8.4%
1950	13,049	+28.7%
1960	12,286	−5.8%
1970	10,072	−18.0%
1980	10,172	+1.0%
1990	10,426	+2.5%
2000	9,768	−6.3%
2010	8,927	−8.6%
2020	7,813	−12.5%

== History ==
The area of present-day Ōsato was part of ancient Mutsu Province, and has been settled since at least the Jōmon period by the Emishi people and a number of shell middens from that era have been found. A number of kofun burial mounds from the Kofun period also exist in the area. During later portion of the Heian period, the area was ruled by the Northern Fujiwara. During the Sengoku period, the area was contested by various samurai clans before the area came under the control of the Date clan of Sendai Domain during the Edo period, under the Tokugawa shogunate. The area was organized into Ōya, Ōmatsuzawa and Kasukawa villages within Kurokawa District, Miyagi Prefecture with the establishment of the modern municipalities system on April 1, 1884.

Ōsato Village was established on July 1, 1954 with the merger of the three villages. Ōsato was raised to town status on April 1, 1959.

== Government ==
Ōsato has a mayor-council form of government with a directly elected mayor and a unicameral town council of 14 members. Ōsato, together with the rest of Kurokawa District and the city of Tomiya collectively contributes two seats to the Miyagi Prefectural legislature. In terms of national politics, the town is part of Miyagi 5th district of the lower house of the Diet of Japan.

== Economy ==
The economy of Ōsato is largely based on agriculture, primarily the cultivation of rice and jute.

== Education ==
Ōsato has one public elementary school and one public junior high school operated by the town government. The town does not have a high school.

== Transportation ==
Ōsato is not serviced by any passenger rail lines. The nearest train station is Atago Station on the Tōhoku Main Line in the neighboring town of Matsushima. Likewise, Ōsato is not on the national highway network.

== Local attractions ==
- Site of Okubo Castle
- Omatsuzawa Shell Mound
- Site of Suwa Castle
- Tsunenaga Hasekura memorial park

== Noted people from Ōsato ==
- Aobayama Hirotoshi – Sumo wrestler
