= Kamiiso, Hokkaido =

Dissolved municipality in Hokkaido, Japan

Kamiiso 上磯町 かみいそちょう
- Town
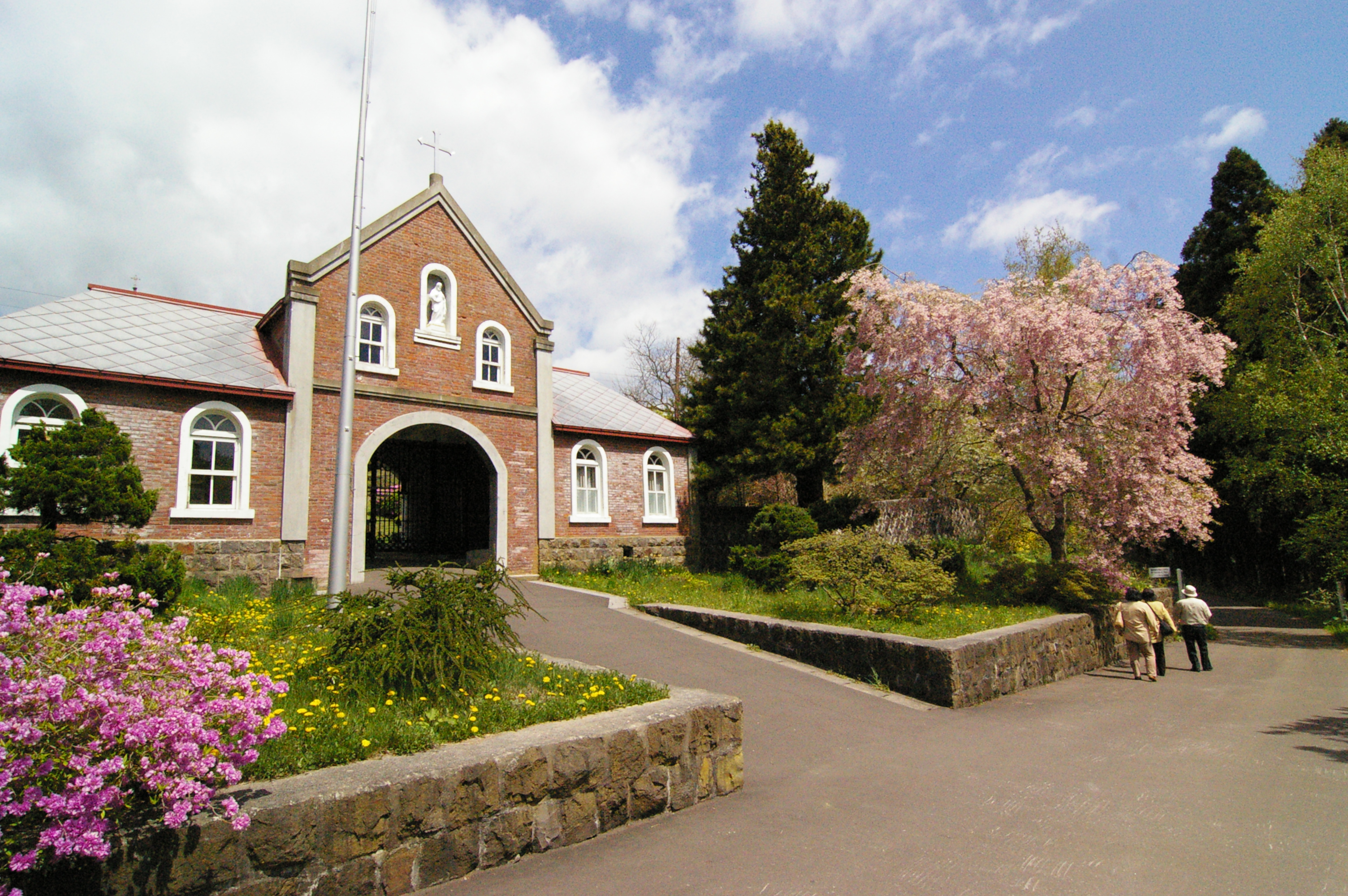
- Tobetsu Trappist Monastery

- Flag Seal
- Interactive map of Kamiiso
- Country: Japan
- Region: Hokkaido
- Prefecture: Hokkaido
- Subprefecture: Oshima
- District: Kamiiso

Area
  - Total: 262.41 km^{2} (101.32 sq mi)

Population (2004)
  - Total: 36,887
  - Density: 140.57/km^{2} (364.07/sq mi)

Kamiiso (上磯町, Kamiiso-chō) was a town located in Kamiiso District, Oshima Subprefecture, Hokkaido, Japan.

As of 2004, the town had an estimated population of 36,887 and a density of 140.57 persons per km^{2}. The total area was 262.41 km^{2}.

On February 1, 2006, Kamiiso was merged with the town of Ōno (from Kameda District) to form the new city of Hokuto.
