= Professional sumo divisions =

- Country: Japan
- Sport: Sumo
- Promotion and relegation: Yes

National system
- Federation: Japan Sumo Association
- Top division: Makuuchi
- Second division: Jūryō

Professional sumo as administered by the Japan Sumo Association is divided into six ranked divisions. Wrestlers are promoted and demoted within and between these divisions based on the merit of their win–loss records in official tournaments. For more information, see kachi-koshi and make-koshi. Wrestlers are also ranked within each division. The higher a wrestler's rank within a division is, the general level of opponents he will have to face becomes stronger. According to tradition, each rank is further subdivided into East and West, with East being slightly more prestigious, and ranked slightly higher than its West counterpart. The divisions, ranked in order of hierarchy from highest to lowest, are as follows:

== Makuuchi ==
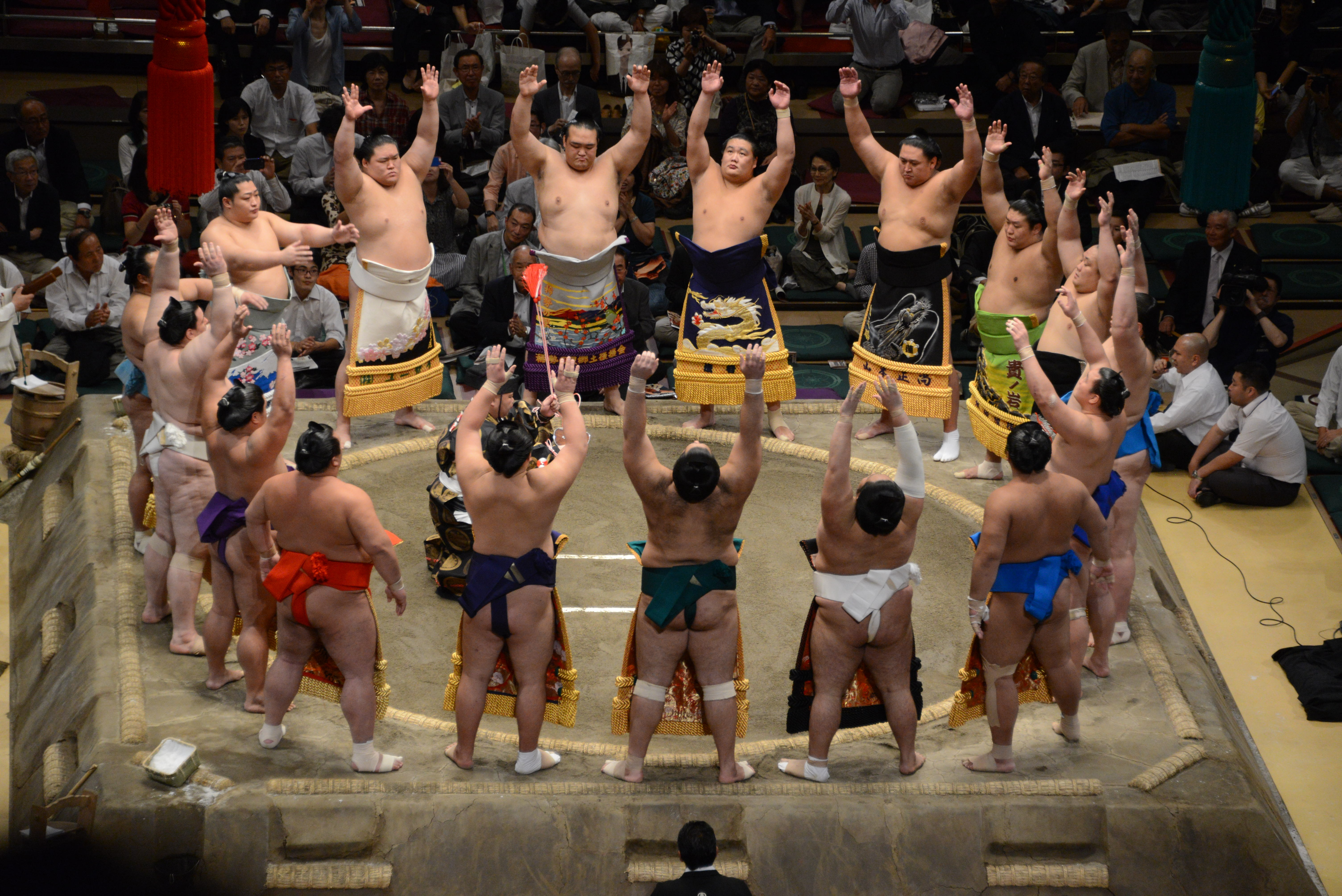
Makuuchi dohyō-iri

Makuuchi (幕内, "inside the curtain"), or makunouchi (幕の内), is the top division. It is fixed at 42 wrestlers who are ranked according to their performance in previous tournaments. At the top of the division are the four ranks of "titleholders", or "champions" called the san'yaku, comprising yokozuna, ōzeki, sekiwake and komusubi. There are typically 8–12 wrestlers in these ranks with the remainder, called maegashira, ranked in numerical order from 1 downwards. This is the only division that is featured on standard NHK's live coverage of sumo tournaments; daily highlights and selected live Sunday matches are broadcast internationally in English on NHK World-Japan. The lower divisions are covered only on streaming services like Abema.

The name makuuchi, literally "inside the curtain", is in reference to the early period of professional sumo, when the top ranked wrestlers were able to sit in a curtained off area prior to appearing for their bouts. Members of the top two divisions makuuchi and jūryō, considered fully salaried professionals as opposed to "in training", are collectively referred to as sekitori.

== Jūryō ==
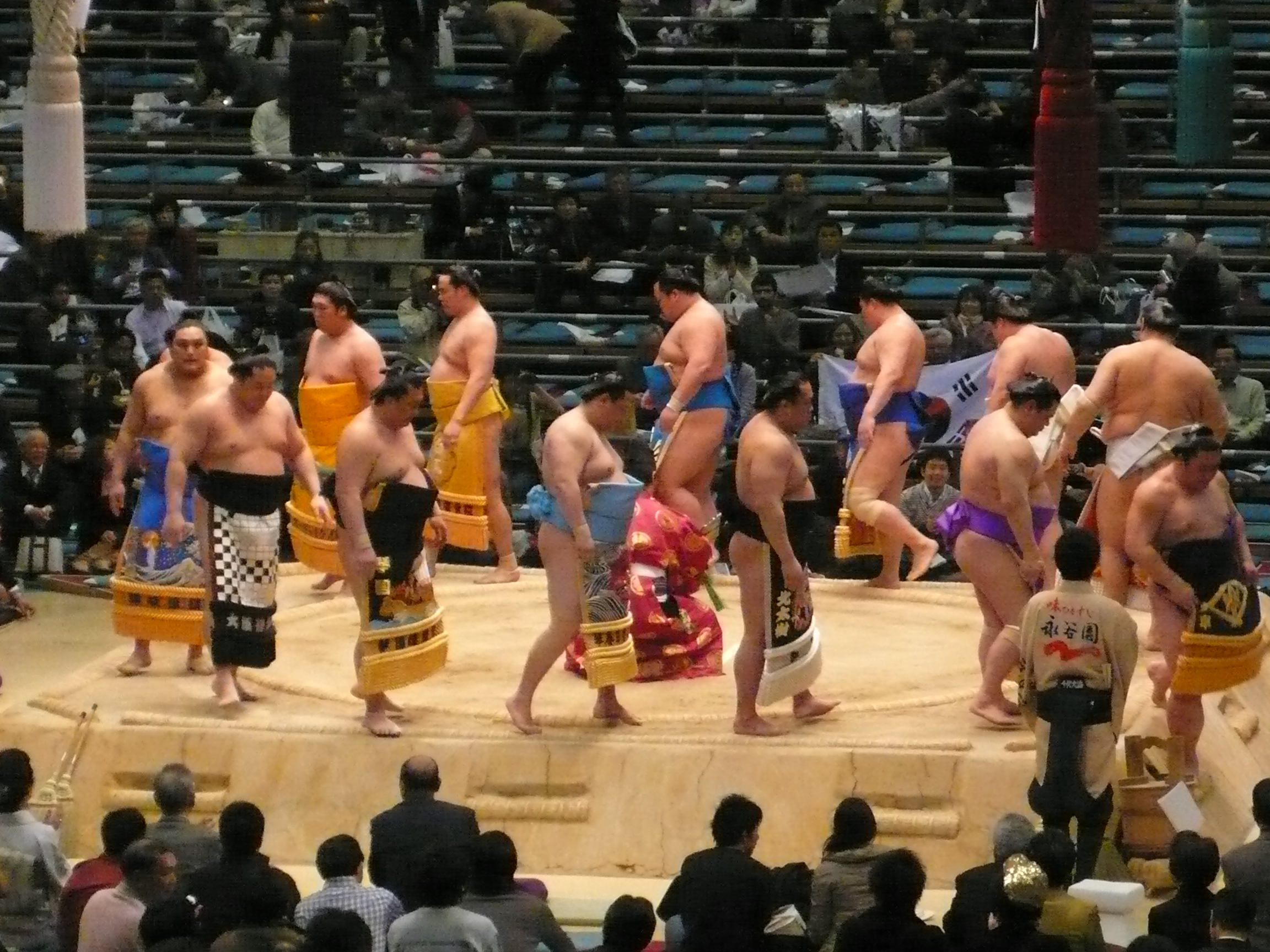
Jūryō dohyō-iri

Jūryō (十両, "ten ryō (coins)") is the second highest division, and is fixed at 28 wrestlers. The name literally means "ten ryō (coins)", which was at one time the income a wrestler ranked in this division could expect to receive. The official name of the second division is actually jūmaime (十枚目, "tenth placing"), as can be heard in official announcements and seen in some publications, but within and outside the sumo world it is almost universally known as jūryō. Wrestlers in the jūryō and the makuuchi division above are known as sekitori. Jūryō wrestlers, like those in the top makuuchi division, receive a regular monthly salary as well as other perks associated with having become a sekitori, or a member of the two upper divisions in sumo. Sumo wrestlers ranked in the divisions below jūryō are considered to be in training and receive a small allowance instead of a salary.

Jūryō wrestlers, along with their makuuchi counterparts, are the only professional sumo wrestlers who compete in a full fifteen bouts per official tournament. In the case of injuries with makuuchi wrestlers pulling out, jūryō wrestlers near the top of the division may find themselves in the occasional matchup with a top-division wrestler. Such jūryō–makuuchi matchups are also not uncommon towards the end of a sumo tournament, in order to better establish promotion and relegation of individuals between the two divisions.

Once a wrestler is promoted to jūryō, he is considered a professional with significant salary and privileges. As such, promotions to jūryō are announced just a few days after a preceding tournament, whereas other rankings are not announced for several weeks.

== Makushita ==
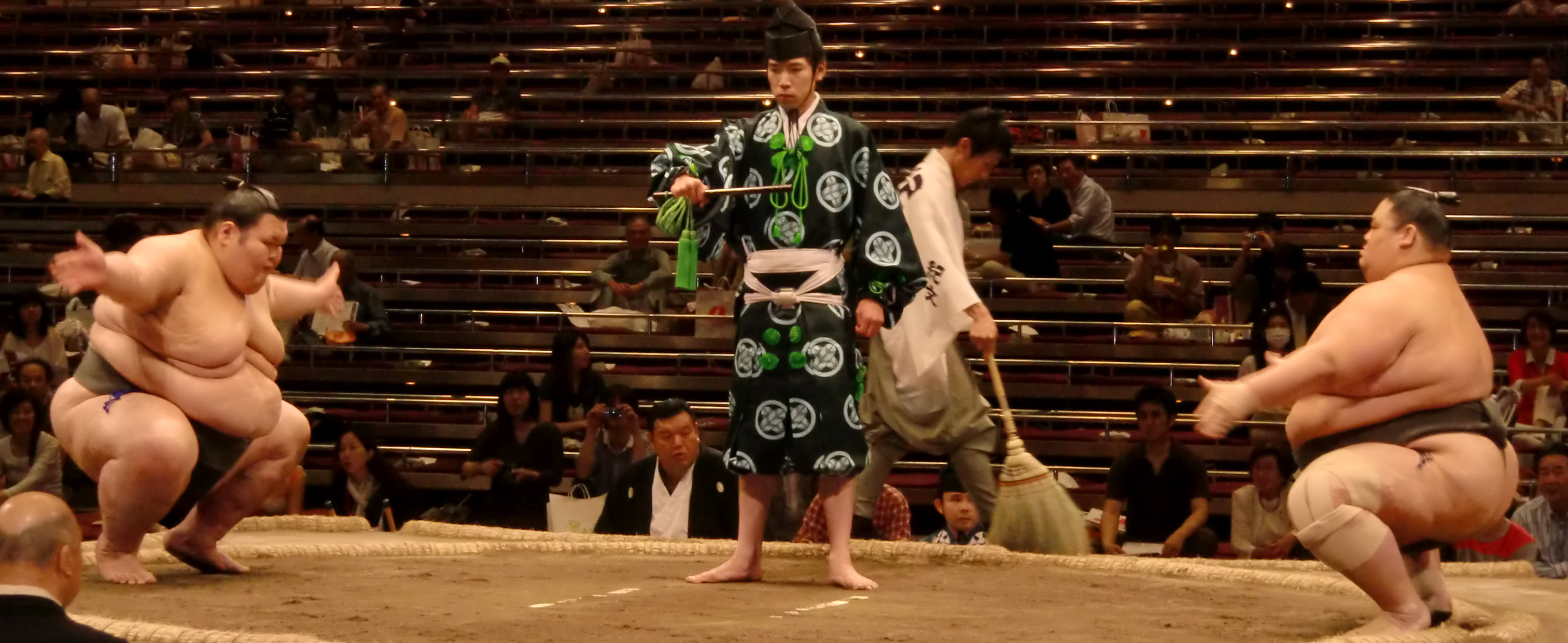
Makushita bout

Makushita (幕下, "below the curtain") is the third highest division. Prior to the creation of the jūryō division, this division was directly below the topmost makuuchi division (translating to "inside the curtain"), and historically the term makushita would even refer to all wrestlers ranked below makuuchi.

In the current system, there are 120 wrestlers in the division (60 ranked on the East and 60 on the West side of the banzuke). Unlike the sekitori ranks above them, wrestlers compete only seven times during a tournament.

It is often considered that holding the rank of makushita is the first step toward becoming a professional (sekitori-ranked) sumo wrestler. Furthermore, it can be regarded as the most heavily contested division, with younger sumo wrestlers on their way up competing with those older sumo wrestlers who have dropped from jūryō and are determined to regain the higher rank. A key incentive is the difference between being ranked in the topmost makushita slot versus the lowest jūryō rank, which has been likened to being that between heaven and hell: a wrestler ranked at makushita or lower is expected to carry out chores for the stable and any sekitori within it, whereas the jūryō wrestler will be served upon. Similarly, the jūryō wrestler receives a comfortable monthly salary, whereas a wrestler below makushita still only receives a small living allowance.

Winning all seven matches in a tournament grants an unconditional advance to the jūryō division if one is ranked within the top thirty wrestlers of the division. For any other member of the division, a 7–0 record will guarantee promotion to within the top thirty members, so two successive 7–0 records will allow a makushita wrestler to advance to jūryō.

Those in the uppermost ranks of the division, and thus slated for a possible advancement, may have a match with those in jūryō, either as one of the seven matches they are expected to compete in, or occasionally in addition to the matches they have already had. This eighth match is sometimes required as a result of tournament withdrawals due to injury of sekitori, and is usually given to makushita wrestlers who have achieved a 3–4 or worse record in their regular seven bouts. It is ignored if one loses and counted if one wins, making it a true bonus bout for a makushita wrestler. In such a match-up, the makushita wrestler will have his hair fashioned into a full ōichō-mage as sekitori do but continues to wear his plain cotton mawashi.

== Sandanme ==
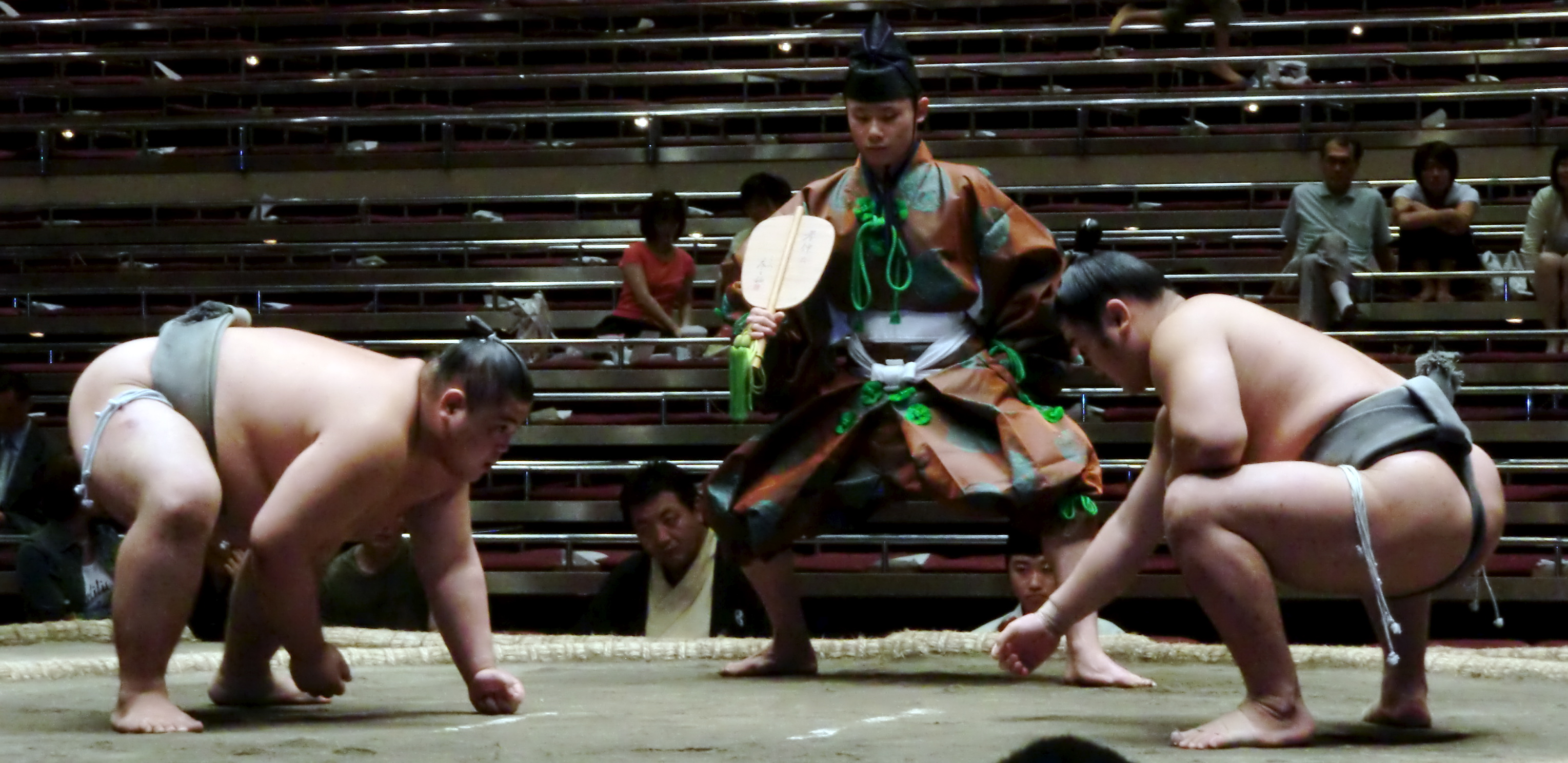
Sandanme bout

Sandanme (三段目, "third tier") is the fourth highest division. This level represents the first break point in the treatment a wrestler receives as he rises up the ranks. From sandanme, he is allowed a better quality of dress; for instance, he no longer needs to wear geta on his feet and can wear a form of overcoat over his yukata. However, the wrestlers are still considered to be in training, receiving only an allowance rather than a salary. As with the other divisions below jūryō, wrestlers only compete in seven bouts, held roughly every other day.

The number of sandanme wrestlers per tournament is 160 (reduced from 180 before the January 2025 tournament. It had previously been 200 before March 2022).

== Jonidan ==
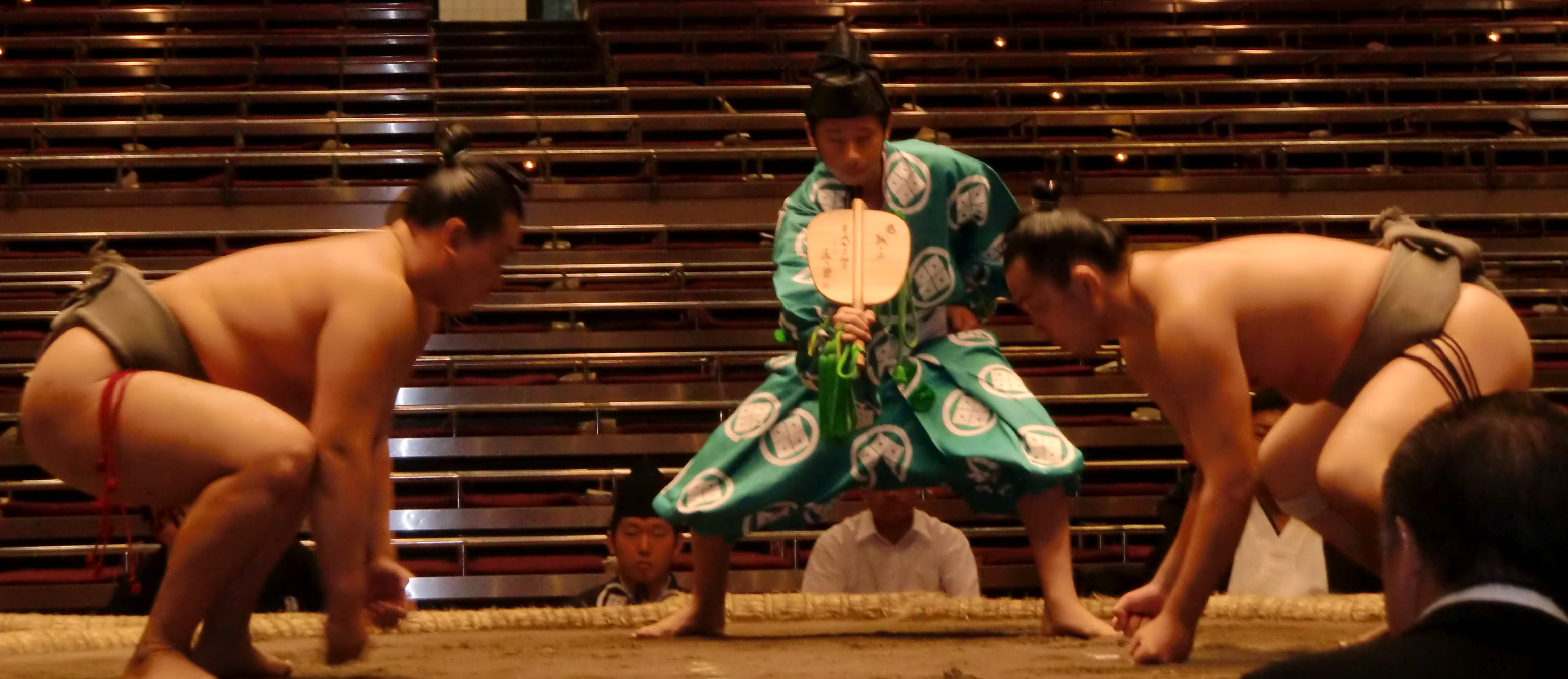
Jonidan bout

Jonidan (序二段, "second stage") is the fifth highest division. Unlike the divisions above it, there is no fixed number of wrestlers in the division although it is usually the largest division in any given tournament, with commonly around 200–250 wrestlers ranked within it. As a result of the numbers, and the fact that, as with the other lower divisions, the wrestlers fight only seven times during a tournament, a play-off tournament on the last day is normally required to determine the division champion.

Wrestlers in this division are forbidden from wearing overcoats over their thin cotton yukata, even in winter, and must wear geta on their feet. They often also pick up many of the more mundane chores within the training stable in which they live.

== Jonokuchi ==
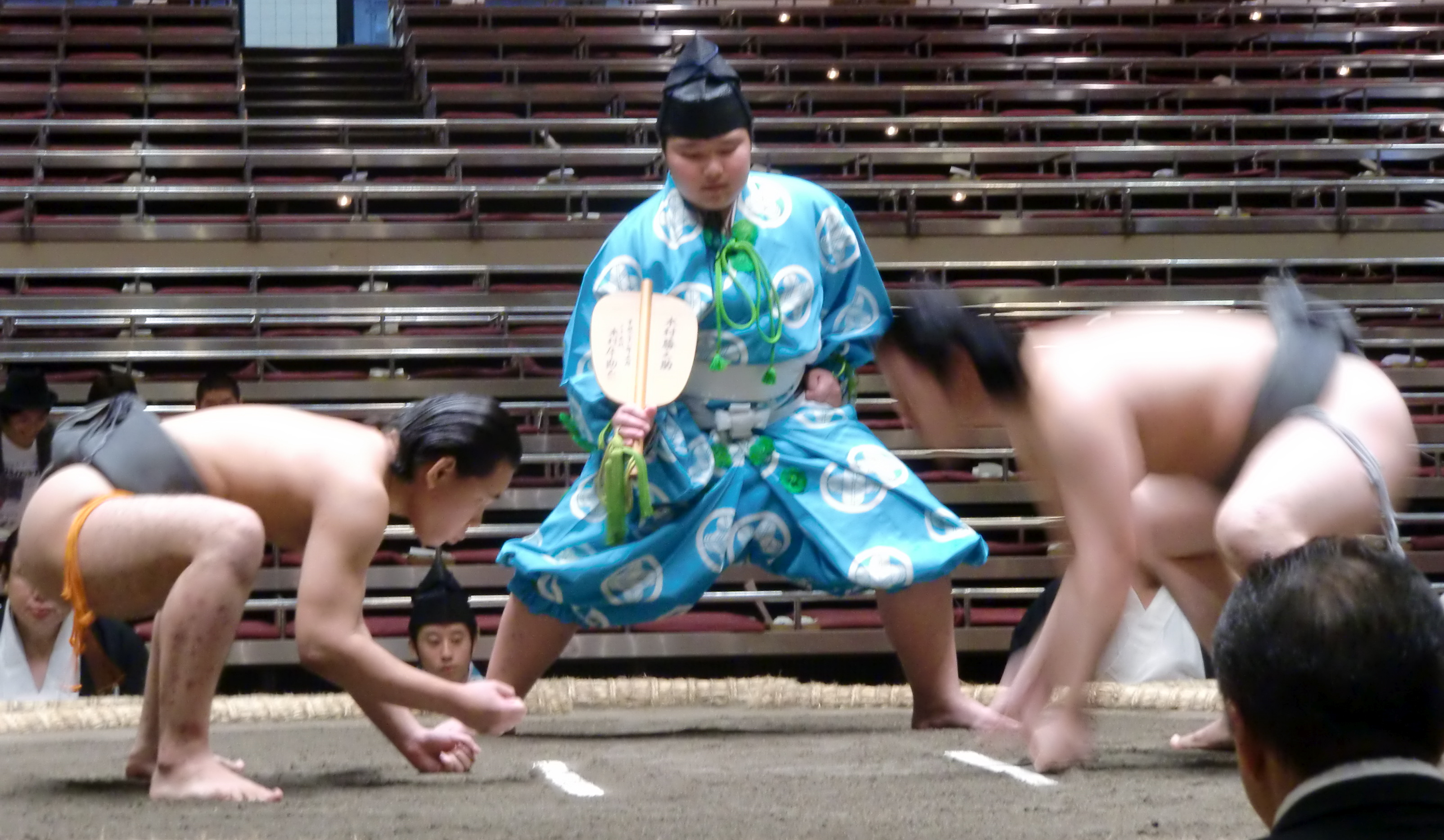
Jonokuchi bout

Jonokuchi (序ノ口, "introduction") is the lowest division. All wrestlers, apart from those who have had successful amateur careers and are given special dispensation to enter makushita or sandanme directly, start in this division. In addition to the new wrestlers, the division tends to consist of other recent recruits to sumo wrestling as well as some older wrestlers who have fallen to the bottom of the ranks due to prolonged injury.

A new wrestler's initial position in the jonokuchi division is determined by his performance in maezumō, a tournament held among new wrestlers at the time of the grand tournament before they are ranked for the first time. The jonokuchi division varies in size and typically includes between 40 and 90 wrestlers, with the high mark being reached for each May tournament as the number of recruits appearing in maezumō is generally largest during the preceding March tournament, when the Japanese school year ends. As with the other lower divisions, wrestlers only compete in seven bouts over the course of the tournament. Jonokuchi is the only division in which wrestlers are semi-regularly promoted even with a losing record; promotions to the next highest jonidan division with a losing record are especially common for the May tournament when there is the large influx of new recruits.

The word jonokuchi is also used as an expression to describe when something has just begun.

== See also ==
- List of sumo stables
- List of sumo elders
- List of active sumo wrestlers
- List of past sumo wrestlers
- List of sumo top division champions
- List of sumo top division runners-up
- List of sumo second division champions
- List of yokozuna
- List of ōzeki
- List of sekiwake
- List of komusubi
- Glossary of sumo terms
