= Hayabusa (sleeper train) =

Former Japanese limited express sleeping car service

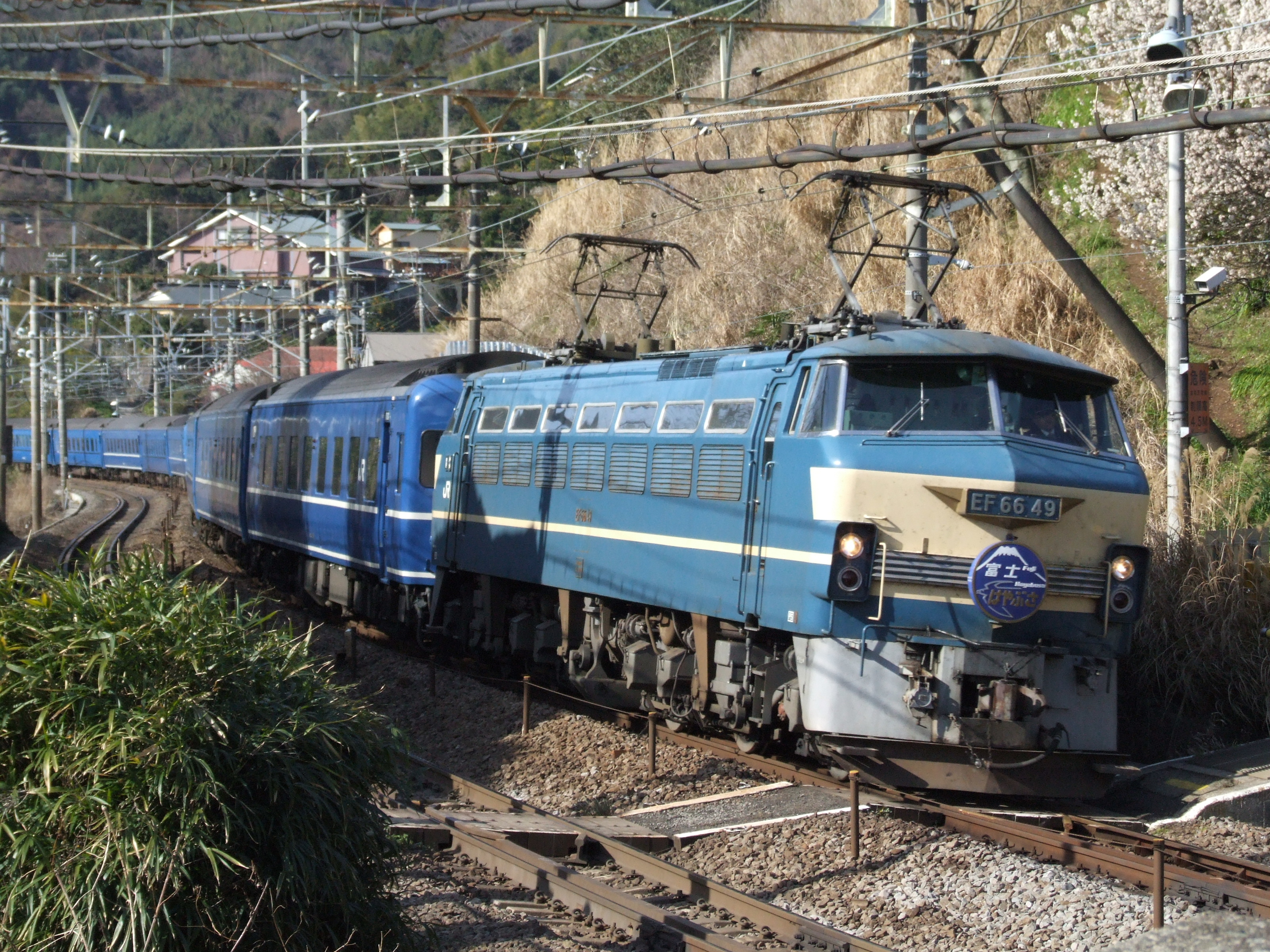
- Combined Fuji/Hayabusa service hauled by an EF66 locomotive, March 2009

Overview
- Service type: limited express sleeping car service
- Status: Abolished
- Locale: Honshu/Kyushu, Japan
- First service: 1 October 1958
- Former operators: JNR; JR West; JR Central; JR Kyushu

Route
- Termini: Tokyo
- Stops: Limited stop

On-board services
- Catering facilities: Trolley service

The Hayabusa (はやぶさ, "Peregrine falcon") was a limited express sleeping car service formerly operated by JR Kyushu which ran from Tokyo to Kumamoto in Japan until March 2009. The name is now used for a Shinkansen service operated by JR East and JR Hokkaido, which runs from Tokyo to Shin-Hakodate-Hokuto from March 2016.

== Route ==
Hayabusa services stopped at Tōkyō, Yokohama, Atami, Numazu, Fuji, Shizuoka, Hamamatsu, Toyohashi*, Nagoya, Gifu*, Kyōto*, Ōsaka*, Sannomiya, Okayama, Kurashiki, Fukuyama*, Onomichi*, Hiroshima, Iwakuni, Yanai, Kudamatsu, Tokuyama, Hōfu, Shin-Yamaguchi, Ube, Shimonoseki, Moji, Kokura, Hakata, Tosu, Kurume, Ōmuta, Kumamoto.

(*) Not served at all trains

The train coupled with the Fuji sleeper between Tokyo and Moji. The Fuji separated and continued to Ōita Station.

The 1315 km Tokyo - Kumamoto run took around 17 and a half hours, leaving Tokyo at 18:03 and arriving in Kumamoto at 12:51. The return service left Kumamoto at 15:57 and arrived in Tokyo at 10:03.

== History ==
The Hayabusa service commenced on 1 October 1958, operating between Tokyo and Kagoshima. From 20 July 1960, the train was upgraded with 20 series sleeping cars, and extended to run to and from Nishi-Kagoshima (now Kagoshima-Chūō). From 9 March 1975, the train was upgraded with 24 series sleeping cars.

Dining car service was discontinued from March 1993.

From 4 December 1999, the Hayabusa was combined with the Sakura service between Tokyo and Tosu.

From 1 March 2005, the Hayabusa was combined with the Fuji service between Tokyo and Moji, following the discontinuation of the Sakura service which previously operated in conjunction with the Hayabusa.

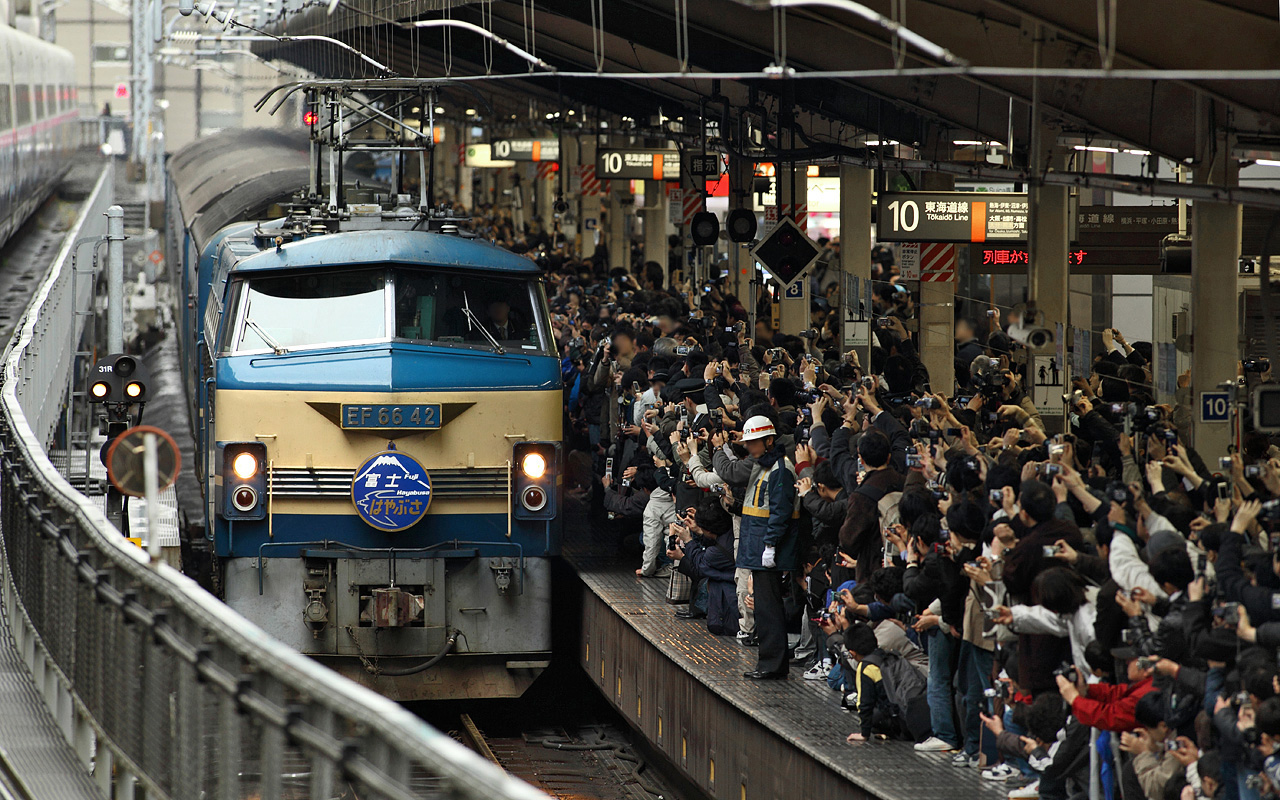
The final Hayabusa and Fuji service after arriving at Tokyo Station, 14 March 2009

Due to declining ridership, the Hayabusa, along with its counterpart service, the Fuji, was discontinued from the start of the revised timetable on 14 March 2009.

== Rolling stock ==
In its final days, the limited express train was formed of 14 series sleeping cars based at JR Kyushu's Kumamoto Depot, typically consisting of six cars in the Hayabusa portion and six cars in the Fuji portion. The train was hauled by a JR West EF66 electric locomotive between Tokyo and Shimonoseki, a JR Kyushu EF81-400 electric locomotive between Shimonoseki and Moji (through the undersea Kanmon Tunnel), and by a JR Kyushu ED76 electric locomotive from Moji to Kumamoto.

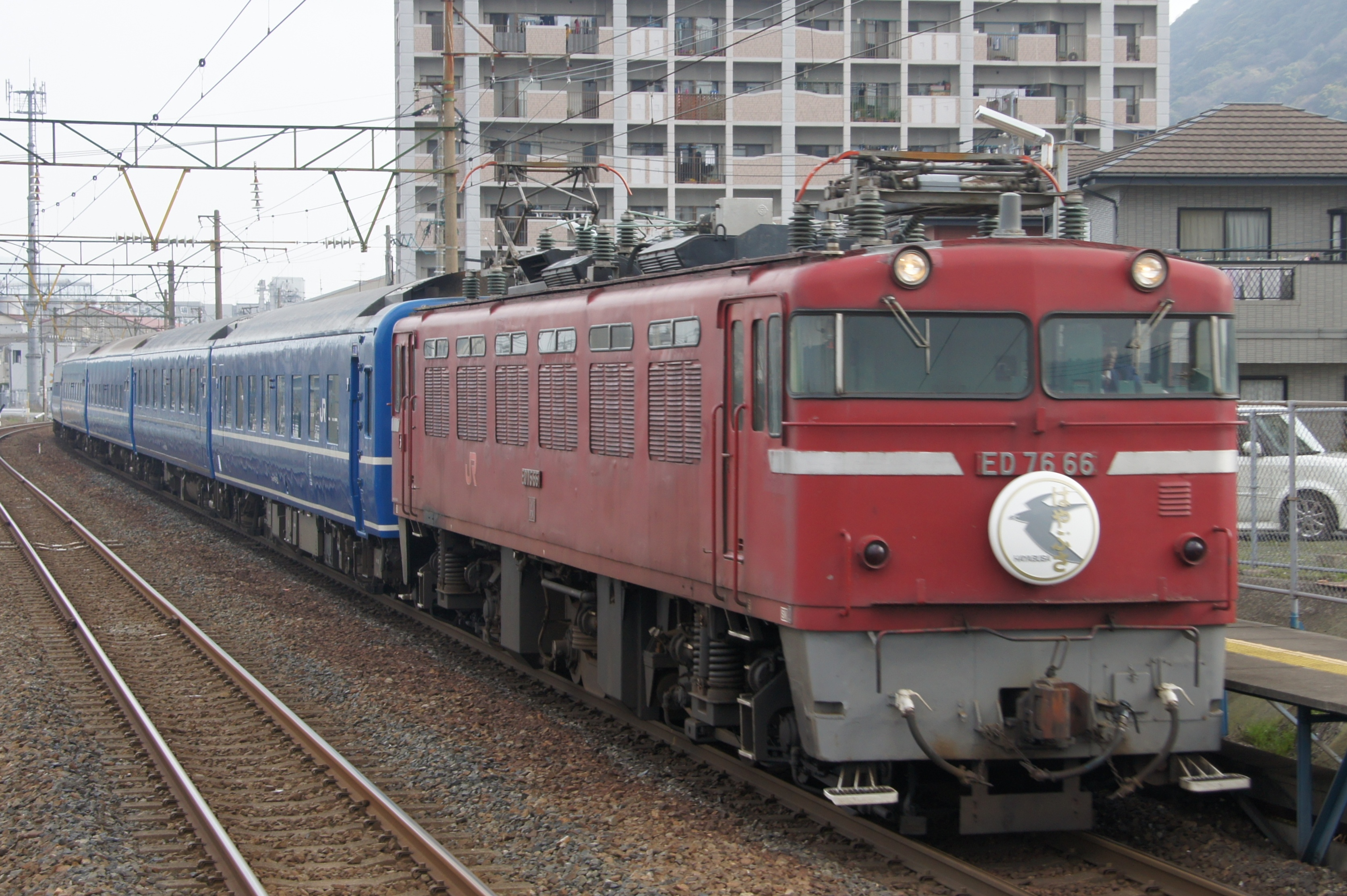
ED76 on a Hayabusa service, March 2010

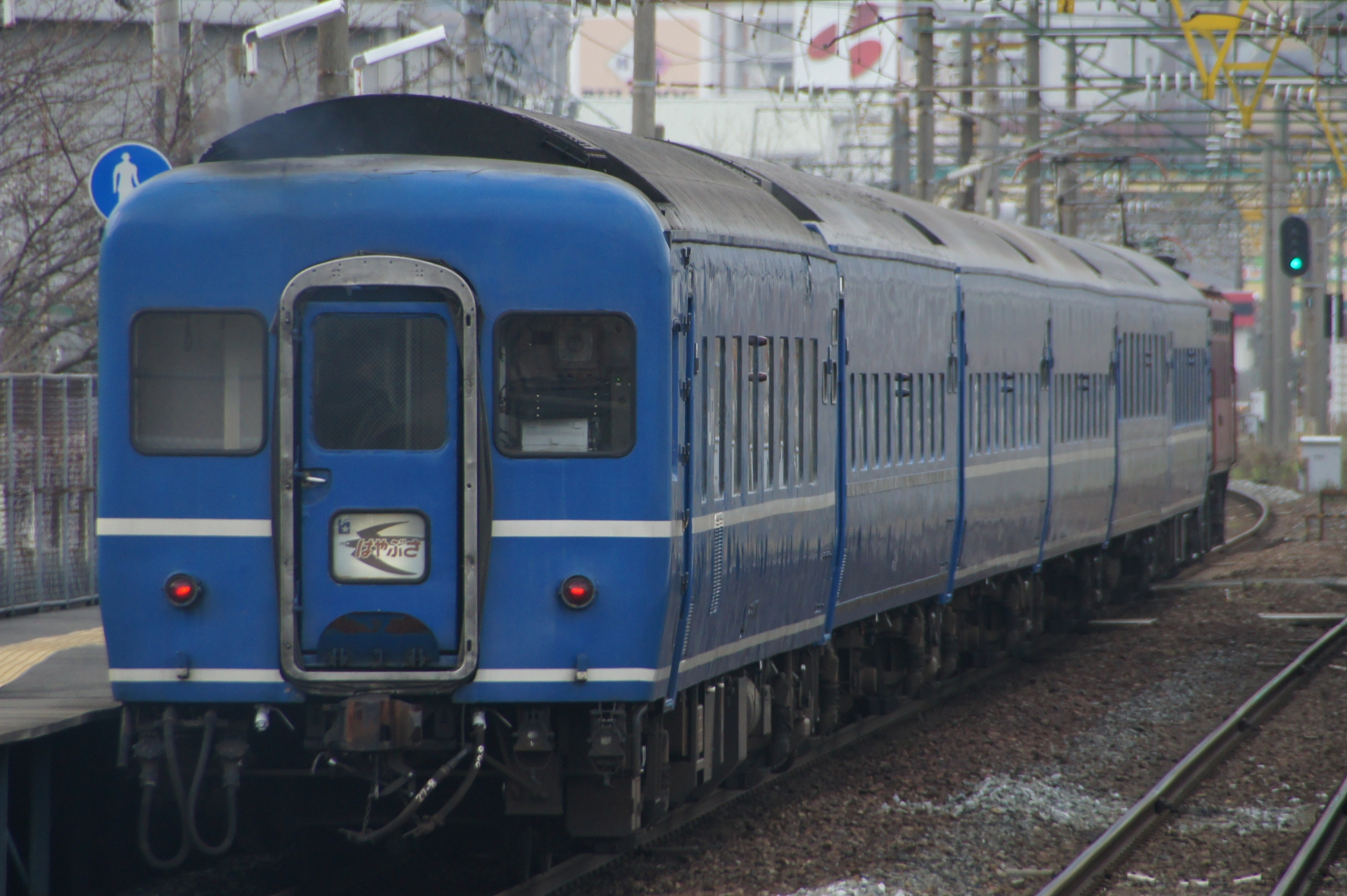
14 series coach at rear of Hayabusa service, March 2010

=== Locomotive types used ===
- Class EF60-500 (Tokyo – Shimonoseki, from 29 December 1963)
- Class EF65-500 (Tokyo – Shimonoseki, from 1 October 1965)
- Class EF65-1000 (Tokyo – Shimonoseki, from July 1978)
- Class EF66 (Tokyo – Shimonoseki, from 14 March 1985)
