= Blue Train (Japan) =

Japanese long-distance sleeper train

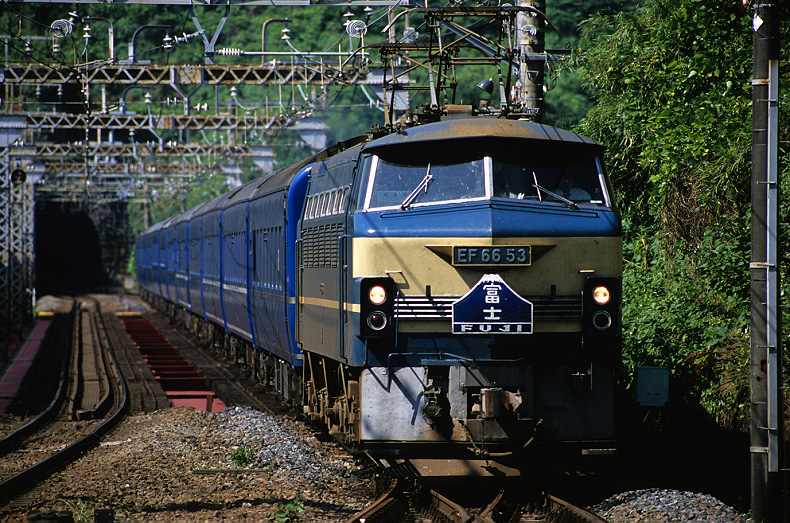
「Fuji」 sleeper train, June 2004

Blue Trains (ブルートレイン, Burū Torein) in Japan were long-distance sleeper trains, nicknamed as such for the color of their train cars. They consisted of 20-, 12-, 14- or 24-series sleeper cars, and connected major destinations within Japan across long distances. For a time, other routes were served by a fleet of newer limited-express overnight trains, which were not blue.

Services slowly began to be eliminated as the Shinkansen (bullet train) network spread and as regional airports opened in the 1980s and 1990s; afterwards, five Blue Train services were eliminated in 2008 and 2009, six more between 2010 and 2015, and the final services in 2016. Aside from luxury "land cruise" excursion trains such as Seven Stars in Kyushu, this has left just two overnight trains (the combined Sunrise Izumo+Sunrise Seto) as the only trains in Japan with sleeping accommodation in regular operation.

== History ==
The first Blue Train was known as the Asakaze. It ran between Hakata and Tokyo beginning in 1956; air-conditioned cars were added two years later. As was the case with sleeper train services in other parts of the world, the Blue Trains acquired a romantic aspect and, at the peak of their popularity in the late 1970s, appeared in many novels. They were sometimes described as "moving hotels".

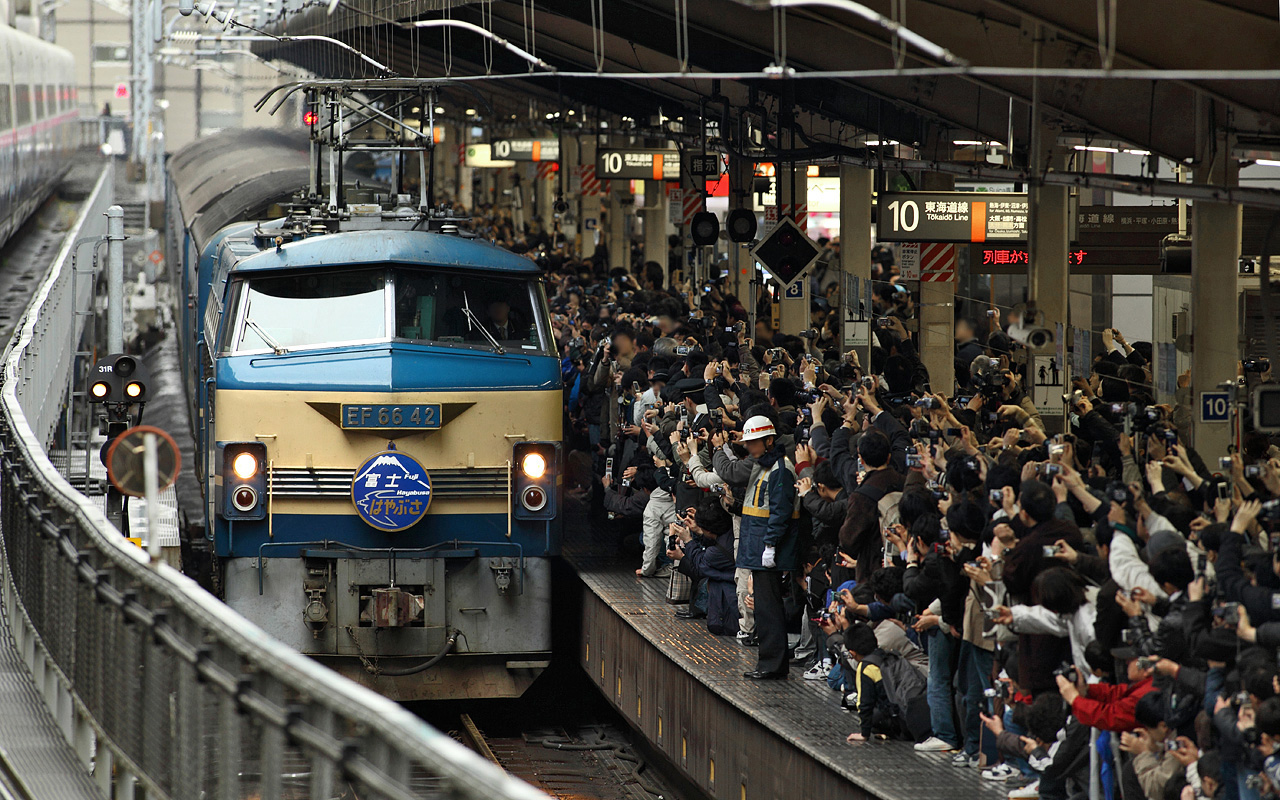
The final Hayabusa and Fuji service after arriving at Tokyo Station on 14 March 2009

However, as buses, airplanes, and the Shinkansen became faster, more popular, and sometimes cheaper, the Blue Trains saw a severe decline in ridership and therefore revenues. 2005 ridership on sleeper trains traveling west from Tokyo was calculated as one fifth of that in 1987. For this and other reasons, such as aging equipment and a shortage of overnight staff, JR made plans to eliminate the majority of the overnight services.

The Asakaze service connecting Hakata and Tokyo was eliminated in 2005, its average occupancy below 30 percent. The Hayabusa and Fuji were eliminated in March 2009. The daily Hokuriku train from Tokyo to Kanazawa was discontinued on 13 March 2010 along with its former Blue Train counterpart, the Noto.

Services like the Cassiopeia (a Blue Train in all but color) retained some popularity among tourists until the completion of the Shinkansen line to Hokkaido.

=== Discontinued services ===
==== Limited express sleeper trains ====
- Akatsuki – connected Kyoto and Nagasaki/Sasebo discontinued in March 2008.
- Akebono – connected Ueno (Tokyo) and Aomori; discontinued in March 2014.
- Aki – connected Shin-Osaka and Shimonoseki; discontinued in October 1978.
- Asakaze – connected Tokyo and Shimonoseki/Hakata and Hiroshima discontinued in 2005.
- Cassiopeia – connected Ueno (Tokyo) and Sapporo three times a week; used deluxe cars; discontinued in March 2016. (Note: Although not technically a Blue Train, the Cassiopeia is included here as it was a luxury overnight service similar to the Twilight Express.)
- Chōkai – connected Ueno and Aomori; merged with Akebono in March 1997.
- Dewa – connected Ueno and Akita; merged with Chōkai in December 1993.
- Fuji – connected Tokyo and Ōita; discontinued in March 2009.
- Hakutsuru – connected Ueno and Aomori; discontinued in November 2002.
- Hayabusa – connected Tokyo and Kumamoto; discontinued in March 2009.
- Hokuriku – connected Ueno and Kanazawa; discontinued in March 2010.
- Hokusei – connected Ueno and Morioka; discontinued in November 1982.
- Hokutosei – connected Ueno and Sapporo; discontinued in August 2015.
- Inaba – connected Tokyo and Yonago; discontinued in October 1978.
- Izumo – connected Tokyo and Hamada; one roundtrip downgraded from Blue Train status (Note: Although the Sunrise Izumo and Sunrise Seto are night trains, they are not considered Blue Trains and are therefore not included on this list.) in July 1998; remaining roundtrip discontinued in March 2006.
- Kii – connected Tokyo and Kii-Katsuura; discontinued in January 1984.
- Mizuho – connected Tokyo and Kumamoto/Nagasaki; discontinued in December 1996.
- Myōjō – connected Shin-Osaka and Nishi-Kagoshima; discontinued in November 1986.
- Naha – connected Kyoto and Kumamoto; discontinued in March 2008.
- Nihonkai – connected Osaka and Aomori/Sapporo discontinued in March 2012, but the train some times connected to Sapporo and Hakodate some days.
- Sakura – connected Tokyo and Nagasaki/Sasebo; discontinued in March 2005.
- Seto – connected Tokyo and Takamatsu; downgraded from Blue Train status in July 1998.
- Suisei – connected Kyoto and Minami-Miyazaki; discontinued in October 2005.
- Tsurugi – connected Osaka and Niigata; discontinued in December 1996.
- Twilight Express – connected Osaka and Sapporo four times a week; used deluxe cars; discontinued from 12 March 2015.
- Yūzuru – connected Ueno and Aomori; discontinued in March 1988.

==== Express sleeper trains ====
- Amanogawa – connected Ueno and Akita; discontinued in March 1985.
- Chikuma – connected Nagano and Osaka; downgraded from Blue Train status in October 1997; discontinued in October 2005.
- Daisen – connected Osaka and Izumoshi; downgraded from Blue Train status in October 1999, discontinued in October 2004.
- Ginga – connected Tokyo and Osaka; discontinued in March 2008.
- Hamanasu – connected Aomori and Sapporo; discontinued in March 2016.
- Hakkoda – connected Ueno and Aomori; discontinued in December 1993.
- Kaimon – connected Mojikō and Nishi-Kagoshima; replaced by Dream Tsubame in March 1993.
- Kitaguni – connected Osaka and Niigata; downgraded from Blue Train status in March 1985; discontinued in 2012.
- Marimo – connected Sapporo and Kushiro; downgraded from Blue Train status in March 1993; discontinued in August 2008.
- Myōkō – connected Ueno and Naoetsu via the Shin'etsu Main Line; downgraded from Blue Train status in March 1985; discontinued in March 1993.
- Nichinan – connected Hakata and Nishi-Kagoshima via the Nippō Main Line; replaced in March 1993 by Dream Nichirin.
- Noto – connected Ueno and Kanazawa via the Shin'etsu Main Line; downgraded from Blue Train status in March 1993; discontinued in March 2010.
- Rishiri – connected Sapporo and Wakkanai; downgraded from Blue Train status in March 1991; discontinued in September 2007.
- Sanbe – connected Yonago and Hakata; discontinued in February 1984.
- Shinsei – connected Ueno and Sendai; discontinued in November 1982.
- Taisetsu – connected Sapporo and Abashiri; replaced in March 1992 by Okhotsk.
- Takachiho – connected Tokyo and Nishi-Kagoshima; discontinued in 1975.
- Towada – connected Ueno and Aomori via the Jōban Line; discontinued in March 1985.
- Tsugaru – connected Ueno and Aomori via the Ōu Main Line; discontinued in March 1985.
