= Fuji (train) =

Former Japanese limited express service

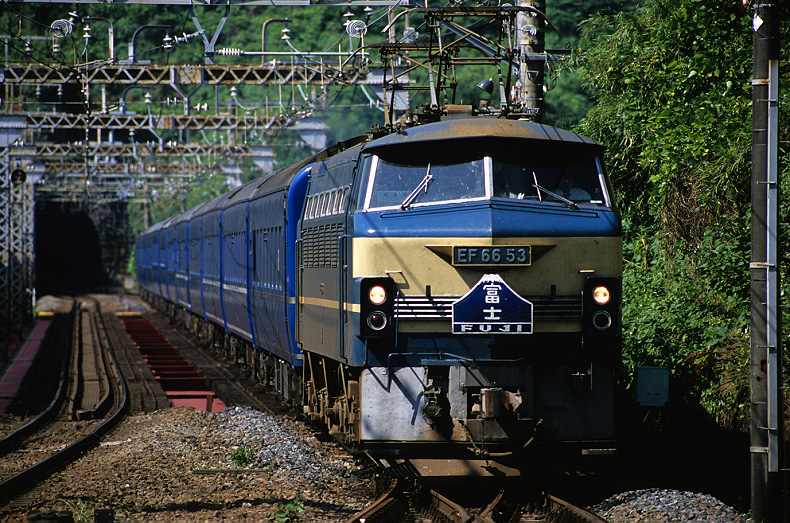
- Fuji service hauled by EF66 locomotive, June 2004

Overview
- Service type: Limited express
- Locale: Tokaido Main Line, Sanyo Main Line, Nippo Main Line
- First service: 1929
- Last service: March 2009
- Current operator(s): JR Kyushu

Route
- Termini: Tokyo; Ōita

Technical
- Rolling stock: 14 series sleeper coaches
- Track gauge: 1,067 mm (3 ft 6 in)
- Operating speed: 110 km/h (70 mph)

The Fuji (富士) was a sleeper train that formerly operated between Tokyo and Ōita in Japan. Operated by the Kyushu Railway Company (JR Kyushu) and classified as a limited express service, it was discontinued from the start of the revised timetable on 14 March 2009.

== Route ==
The train was coupled with the Hayabusa sleeper between Tokyo and Moji Station. The Hayabusa separated at Moji and continued to Hakata and Kumamoto.

The 1,240 km Tokyo-Ōita run took just over seventeen hours, leaving Tokyo at 18:03 and arriving in Ōita at 11:17. The return service left Ōita at 16:48 and arrived in Tokyo at 09:58.

== History ==
=== Pre-World War II ===
The Fuji began as a long-distance daytime service in 1912, although the train did not receive a name until September 1929. It was one of two long-distance services on the Tōkaidō-Sanyō corridor. The other train on the route, named Sakura, was aimed at middle-class travelers, while Fuji had higher-class rooms, dining cars serving Western food and a "Momoyama" observation car. Fuji and Sakura were the first named trains in Japan.

Fuji services originally operated between Tokyo and Shimonoseki Station. Connecting ferries were available from Shimonoseki to Pusan, Korea, from which passengers could connect to train services bound for China, Russia, and even Europe. In November 1942, service was extended to Nagasaki, from where ferries were available to Shanghai.

Fuji services were suspended in April 1944 due to Japan's deteriorating situation in World War II.

=== Post-World War II ===
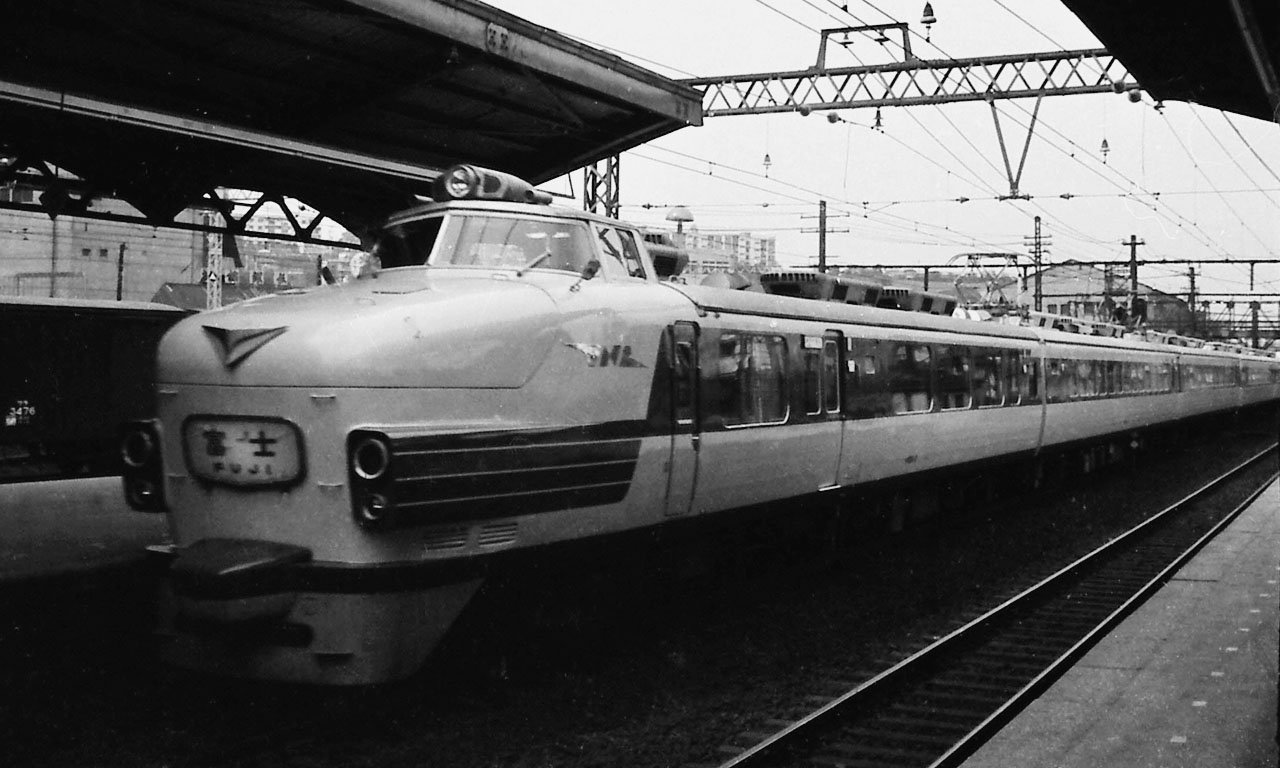
A 151 series EMU on a Fuji service

The Fuji name was briefly used on a Shinjuku - Kawaguchiko service (Chūō Main Line) in 1950, but did not return to the Tokaido corridor until 1 October 1961, when the Fuji service resumed as a daytime limited express between Tokyo and Kobe using 151 series EMUs.

After the Tokaido Shinkansen opened on 1 October 1964, the Fuji became a Tokyo-Ōita sleeper service using 20 series sleeping cars. Between 1965 and 1980, the service was extended to Nishi-Kagoshima Station, becoming the longest train service in Japanese history: the 1,574.2 km (978.2 mi) Tokyo-Kagoshima run took over 24 hours (departing Tokyo at 18:00 and arriving Nishi-Kagoshima at 18:03). From 1980 to 1997, the Fuji operated between Tokyo and Miyazaki (Miyazaki Station or Minami-Miyazaki Station).

Dining car service was discontinued from March 1993.

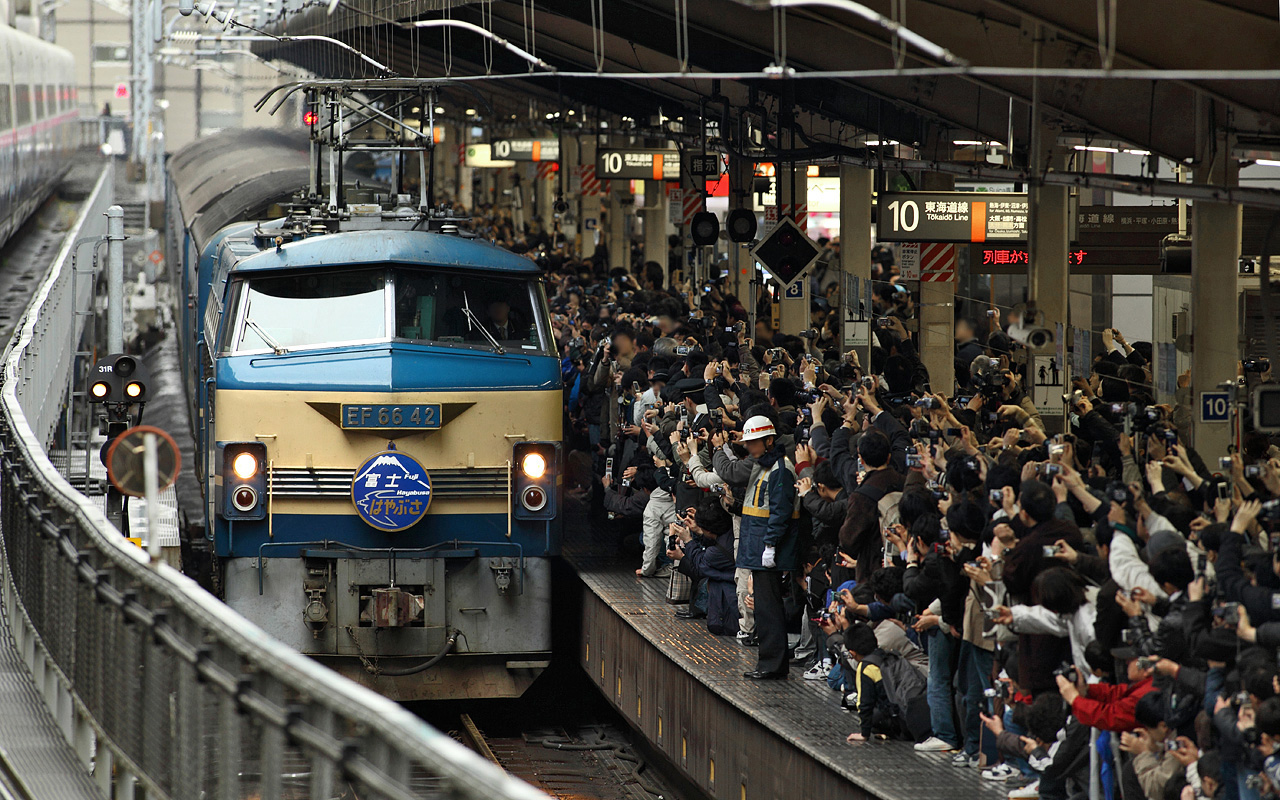
The final Hayabusa and Fuji sleeping car service after arriving at Tokyo Station, 14 March 2009

From 1 March 2005, the Fuji was combined with the Hayabusa service between Tokyo and Moji, following the discontinuation of the Sakura service which previously operated in conjunction with the Hayabusa. Finally, the Fuji was discontinued in its entirety from the start of the revised timetable on 14 March 2009, due to declining ridership.

== Rolling stock ==
The train was formed of 14 series sleeping cars based at JR Kyushu's Kumamoto Depot, typically consisting of six cars in the Hayabusa portion and six cars in the Fuji portion. The train was hauled by a JR West Class EF66 electric locomotive between Tokyo and Shimonoseki, a JR Kyushu Class EF81-400 electric locomotive between Shimonoseki and Moji (through the undersea Kanmon Tunnel), and by a JR Kyushu Class ED76 electric locomotive from Moji to Ōita.

== Gallery ==
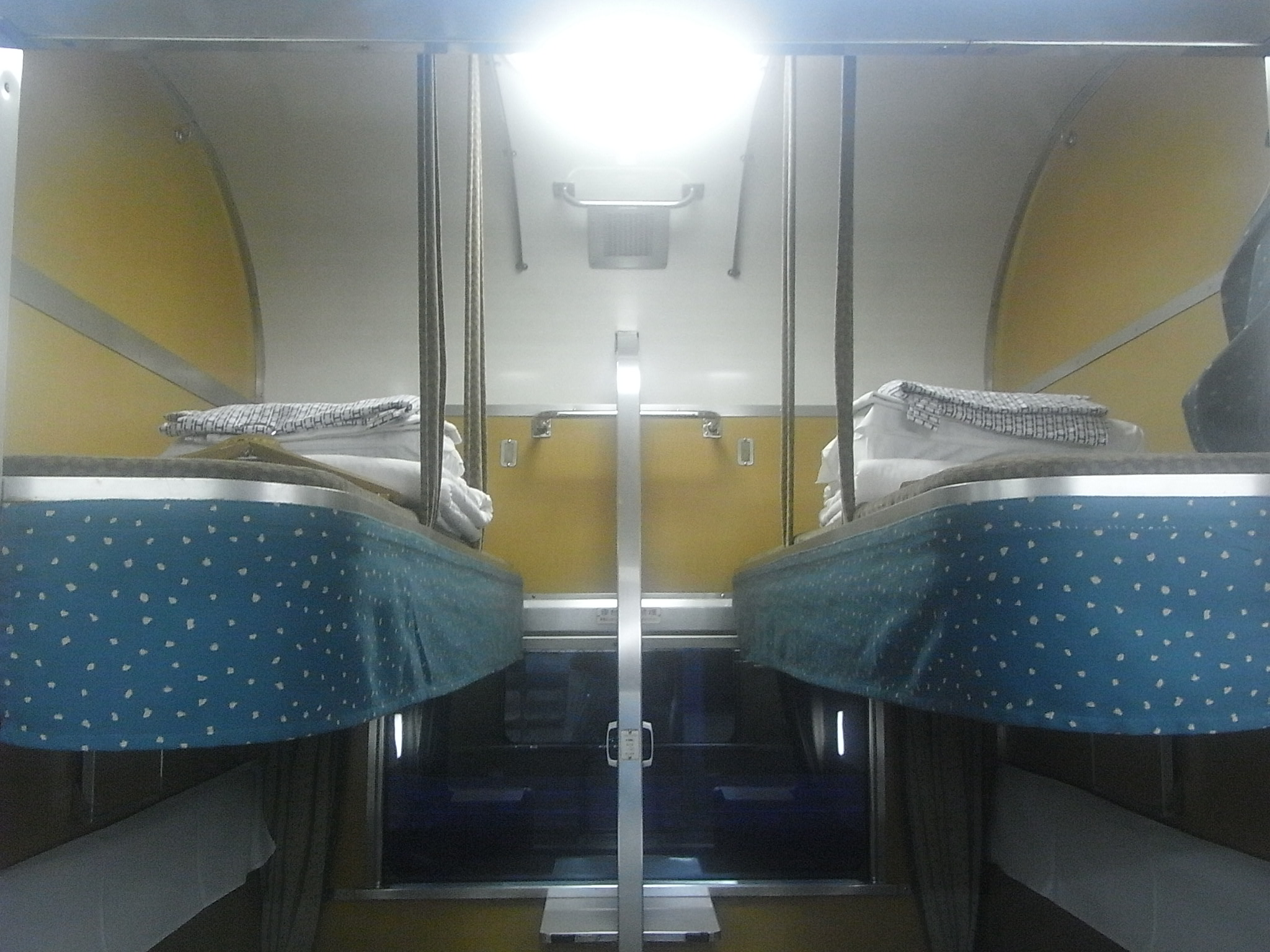
Beds (March 2009)

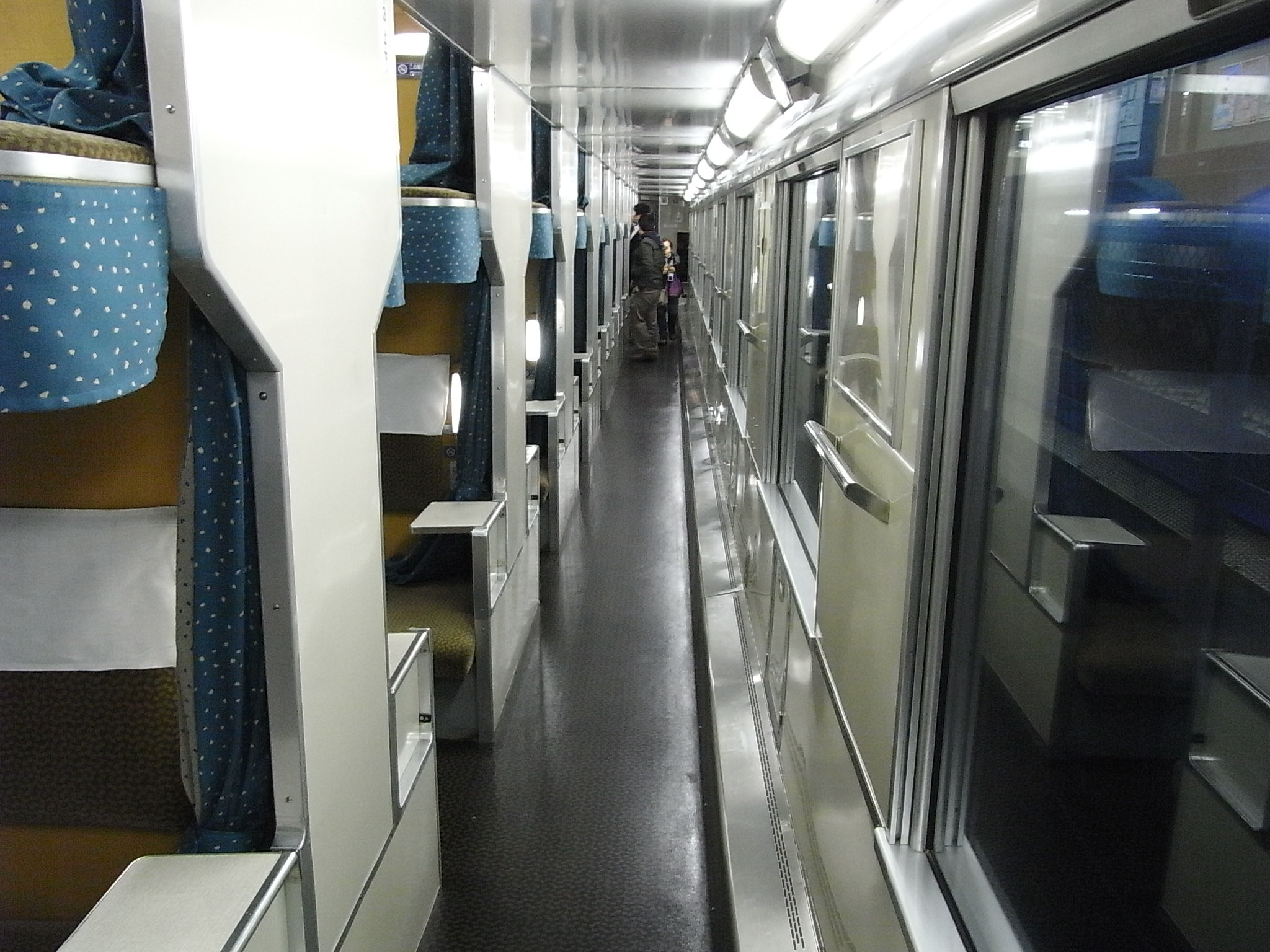
Passageway (March 2009)

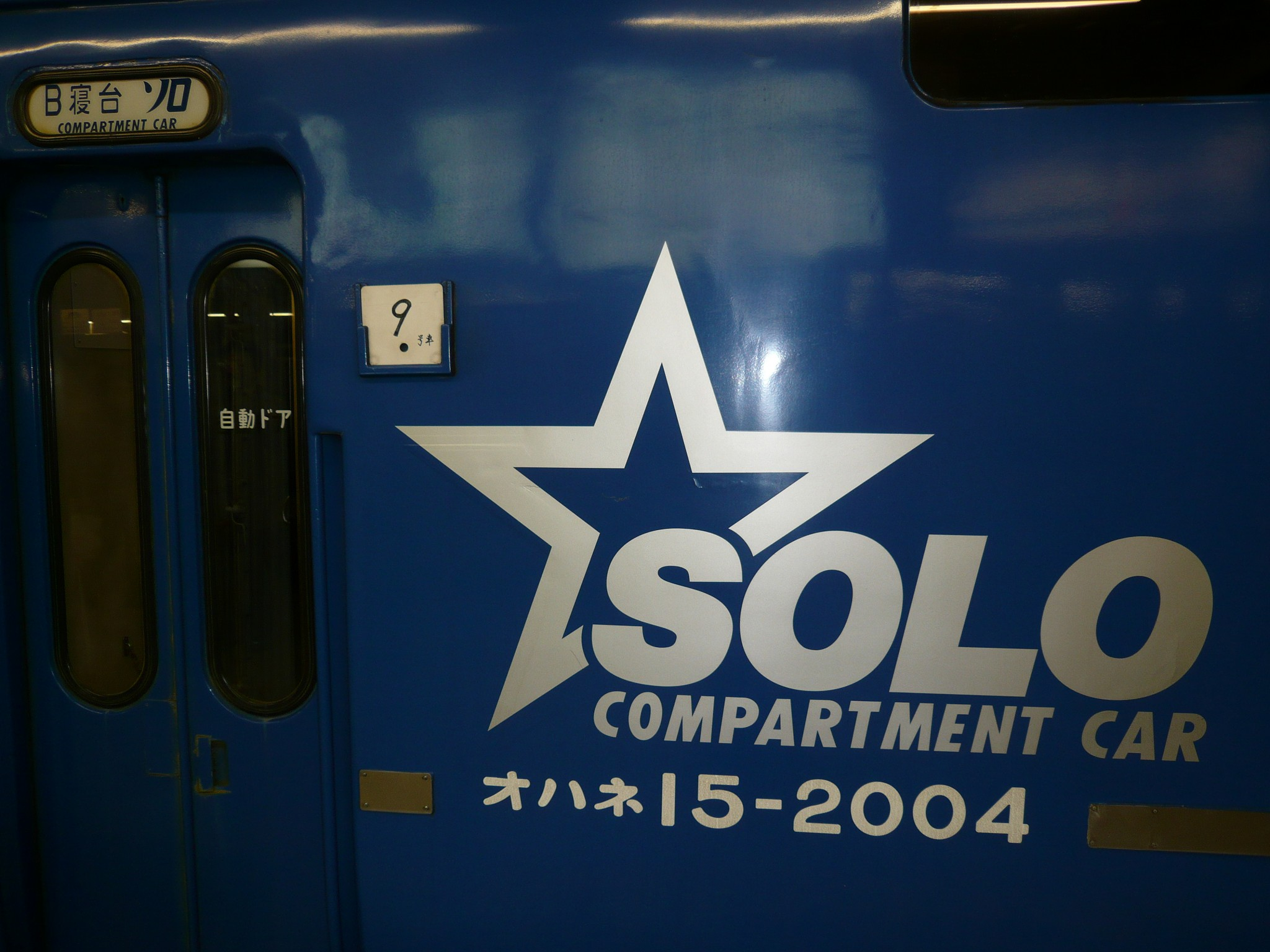
Entrance of a car (November 2008)

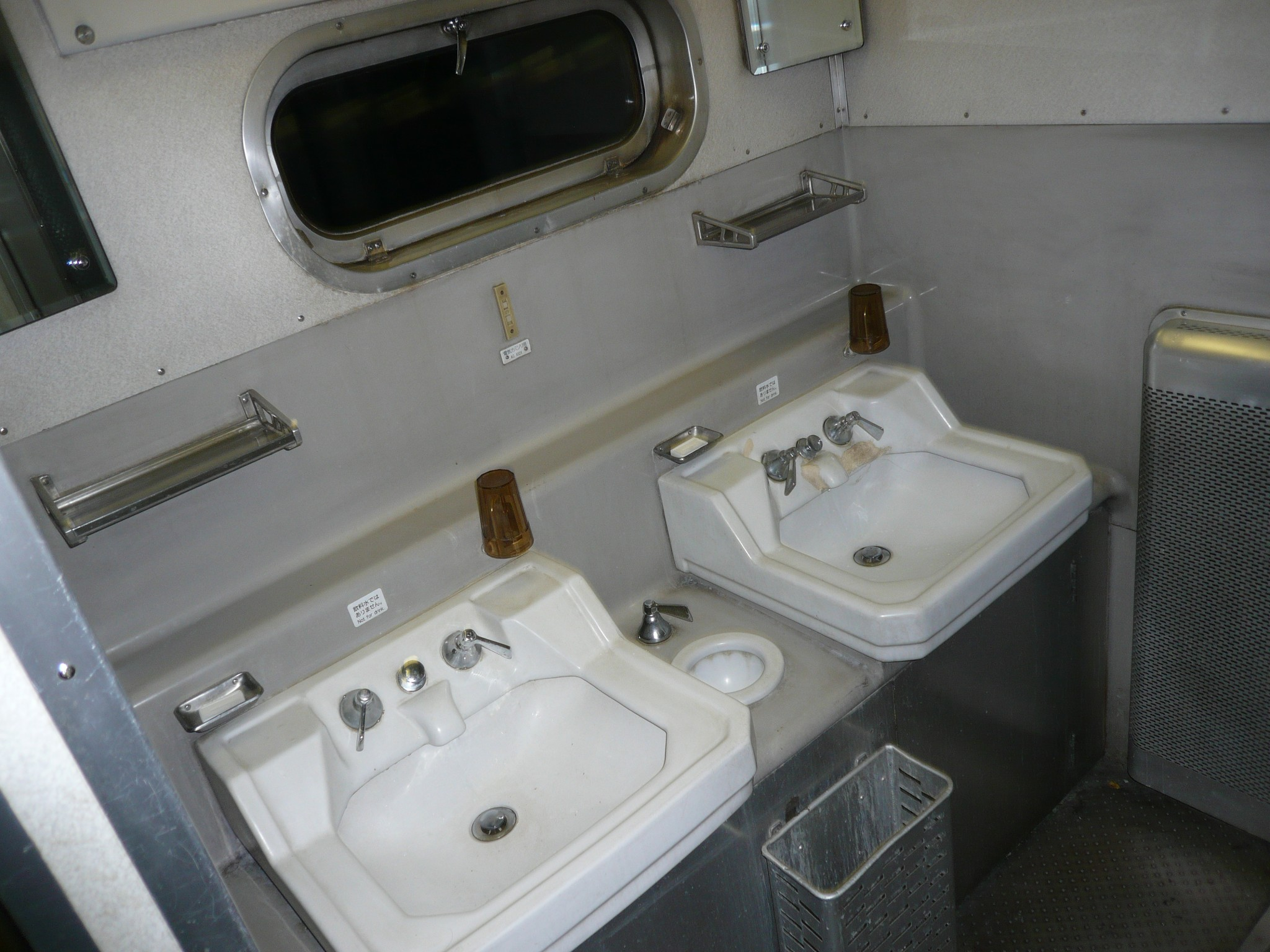
Washstand (November 2008)

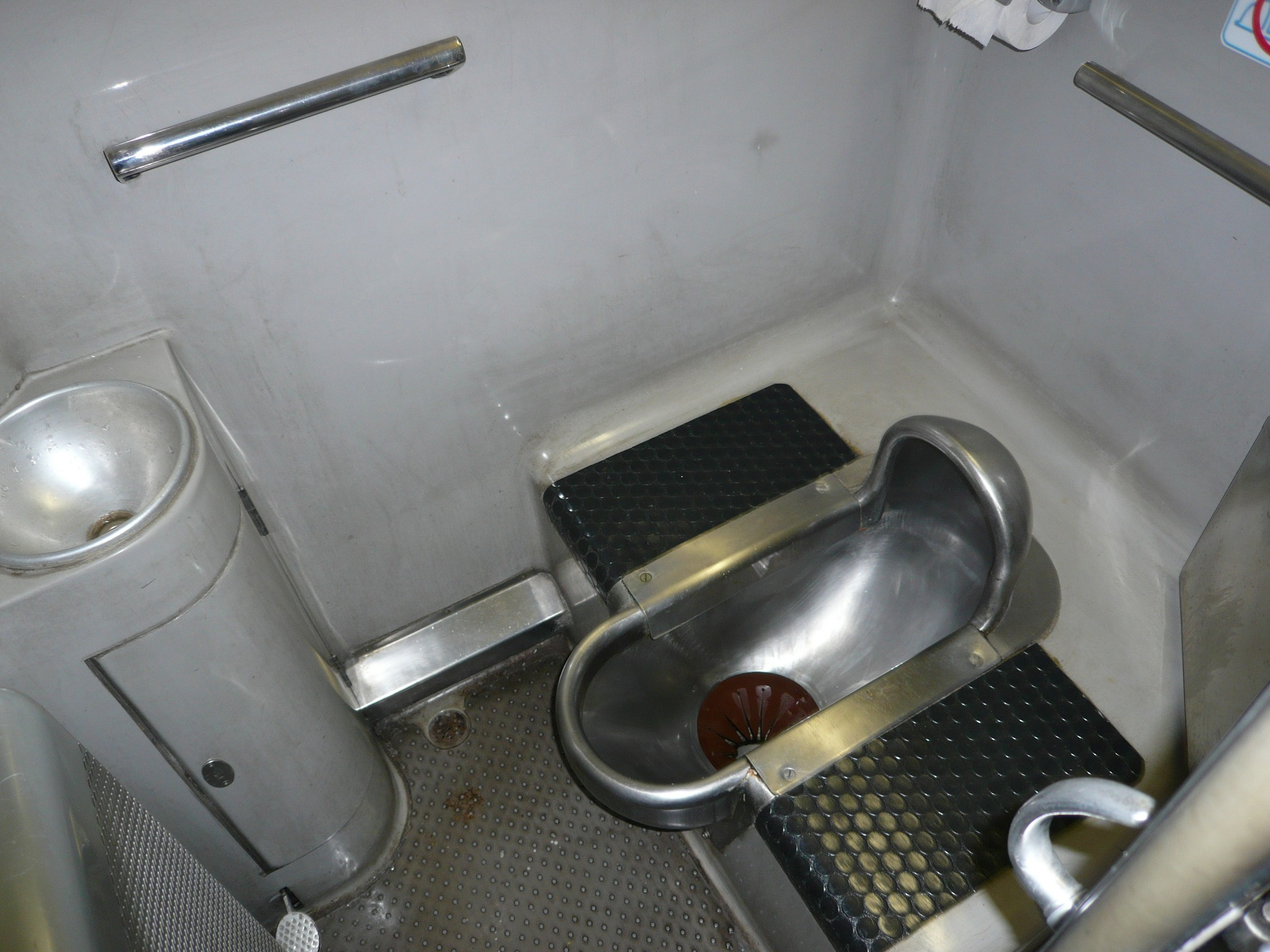
Toilet (November 2008)

== See also ==
- Blue Train (Japan)
