= JNR Class EF81 =

Japanese electric locomotive class

Class EF81
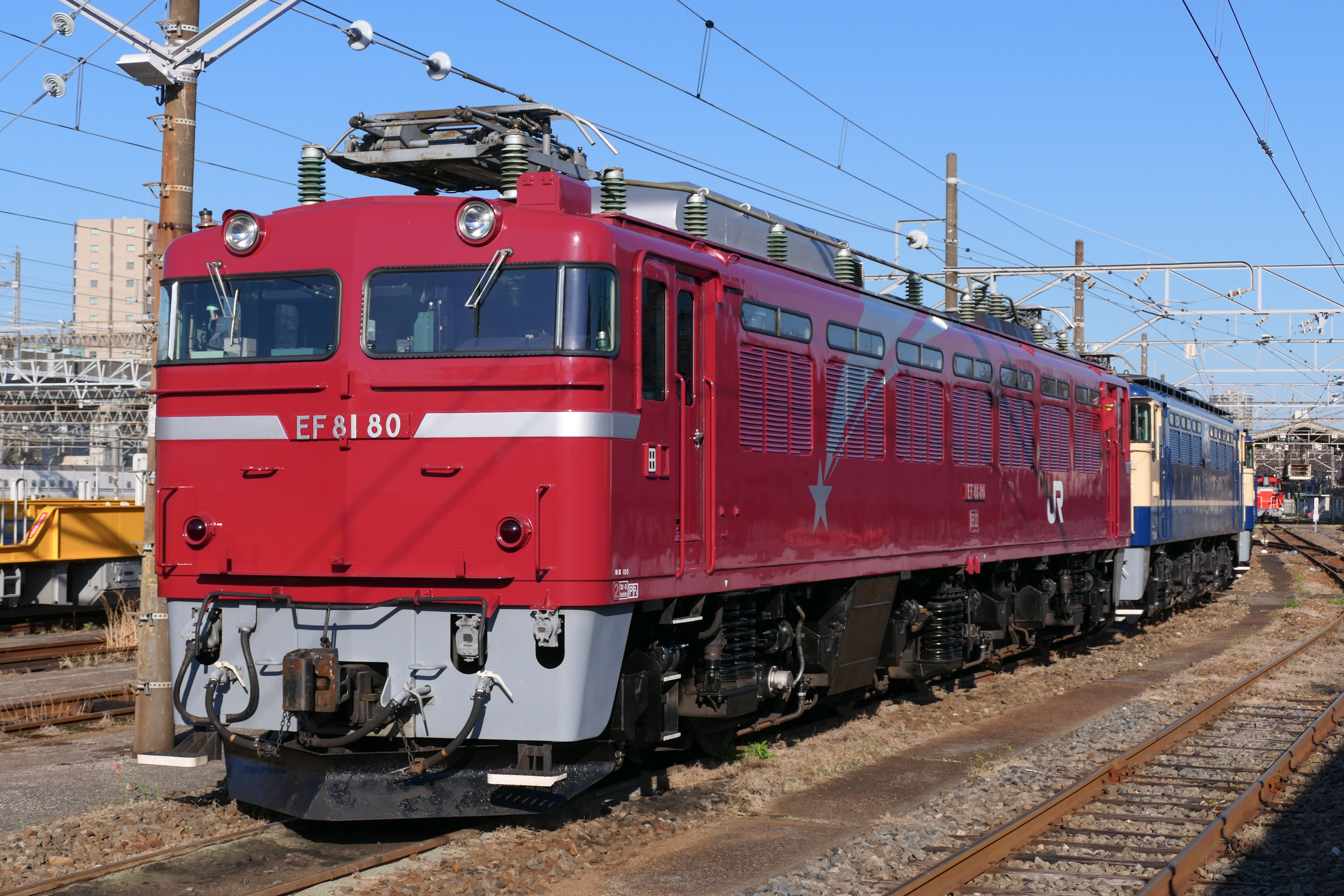
- JR East EF81 80 in March 2021
Type and origin
- Power type: Electric
- Builder: Hitachi, Mitsubishi
- Build date: 1968–1992
- Total produced: 161
Specifications
- Configuration
  - UIC: Bo′Bo′Bo′
- Gauge: 1,067 mm (3 ft 6 in)
- Bogies: DT138 (outer), DT139 (centre)
- Wheel diameter: 1,120 mm (44.09 in)
- Length: 18,600 mm (61 ft 1/4 in)
- Width: 2,900 mm (9 ft 6 1/8 in)
- Height: 4,280 mm (14 ft 1/2 in)
- Loco weight: 100.8 t (99.2 long tons; 111.1 short tons)
- Electric system/s: 1,500 V DC / 20 kV AC at 50/60 Hz overhead wire
- Current pickup: pantograph
- Traction motors: MT52A x6
- Loco brake: Air and Electrical regenerative
- Train brakes: Air
- Safety systems: ATS-SF
Performance figures
- Maximum speed: 110 km/h (70 mph)
- Power output: 2,550 kW (3,420 hp) (on DC); 2,370 kW (3,180 hp) (on AC)
Career
- Operators: JNR (1968-1987); JR Freight (1987- ); JR East (1987- ); JR West (1987-); JR Kyushu (1987-?)
- Number in class: 44 (as of 1 April 2016)
- Delivered: 1968
- Preserved: 4
- Disposition: In service

The Class EF81 is a six-axle Bo-Bo-Bo wheel arrangement multi-voltage AC/DC electric locomotive type operated on passenger and freight services in Japan since 1968. As of 1 April 2016, 44 locomotives remained in service, operated by JR Freight, JR East, and JR West.

== Variants ==
- EF81-0: Numbers EF81 1 – 152, built 1968–1979
- EF81-300: Numbers EF81 301 – 304, built 1973–1975
- EF81-400: Numbers EF81 401 – 414
- EF81-450: Numbers EF81 451 – 455, built 1991–1992
- EF81-500: Numbers EF81 501 – 503, built 1989
- EF81-600: Former EF81-0 locomotives renumbered by JR Freight from May 2012

== EF81-0 ==
152 locomotives were built from 1968 to 1979 in three batches and numbered EF81 1 to EF81 152. 14 EF81-0 locomotives were later modified to become Class EF81-400. The prototype locomotive, EF81 1, was built by Hitachi, and delivered in 1968. Locomotives EF81 137 onward were built with sun-visor plates above the cab windows. These were also subsequently retro-fitted to locomotives EF81 133 to 136.

The prototype, EF81 1, was withdrawn on 31 March 2004.

From May 2012, JR Freight locomotives not fitted with driving recording units mandated for operations over 100 km/h (60 mph) were renumbered by adding "600" to the running number to differentiate them from the other members of the sub-class fitted.

As of 1 April 2016, 18 Class EF81-0 locomotives remained in service, operated by JR East and JR West.

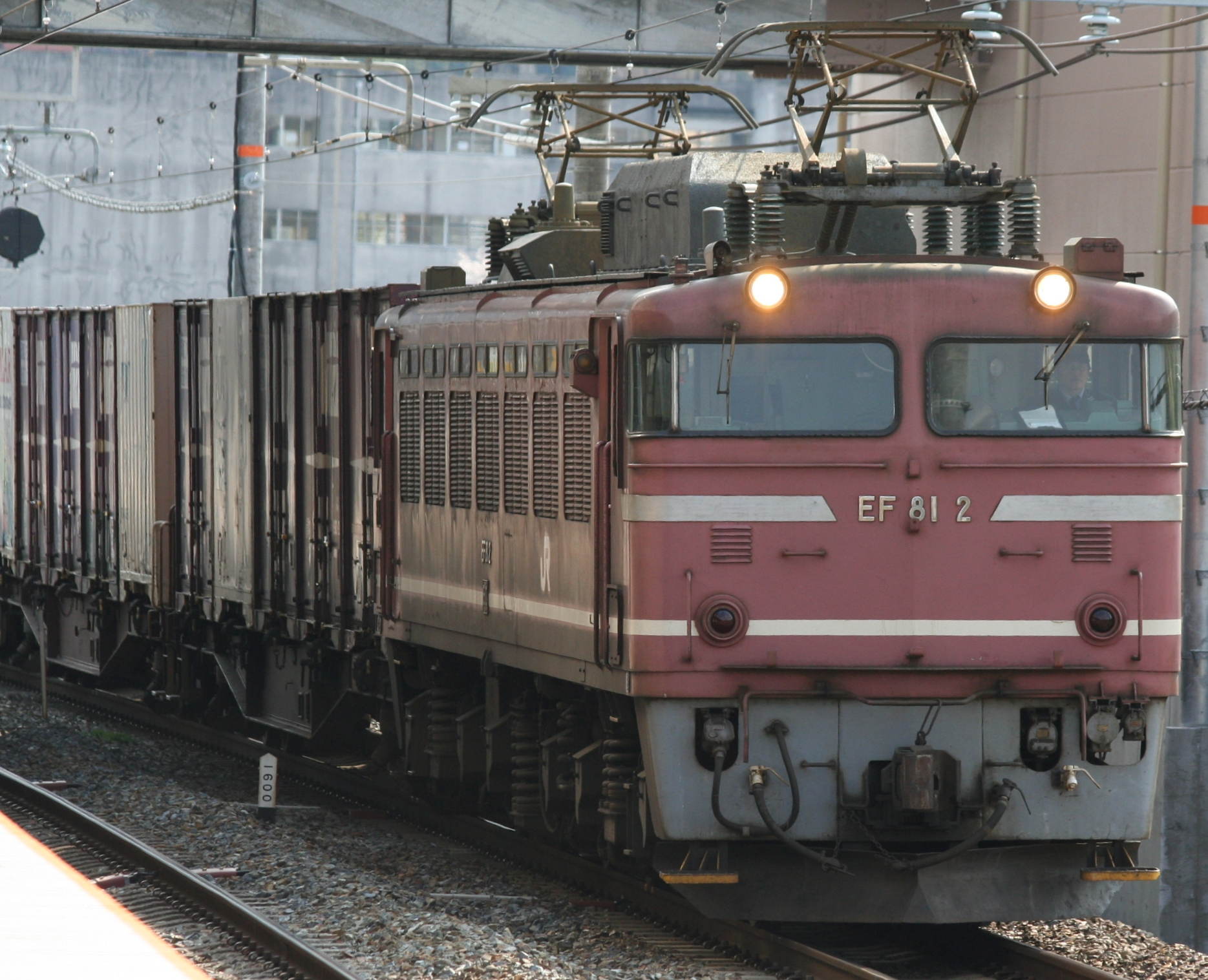
EF81 2 (first batch) with white stripes indicating refurbishment in March 2008

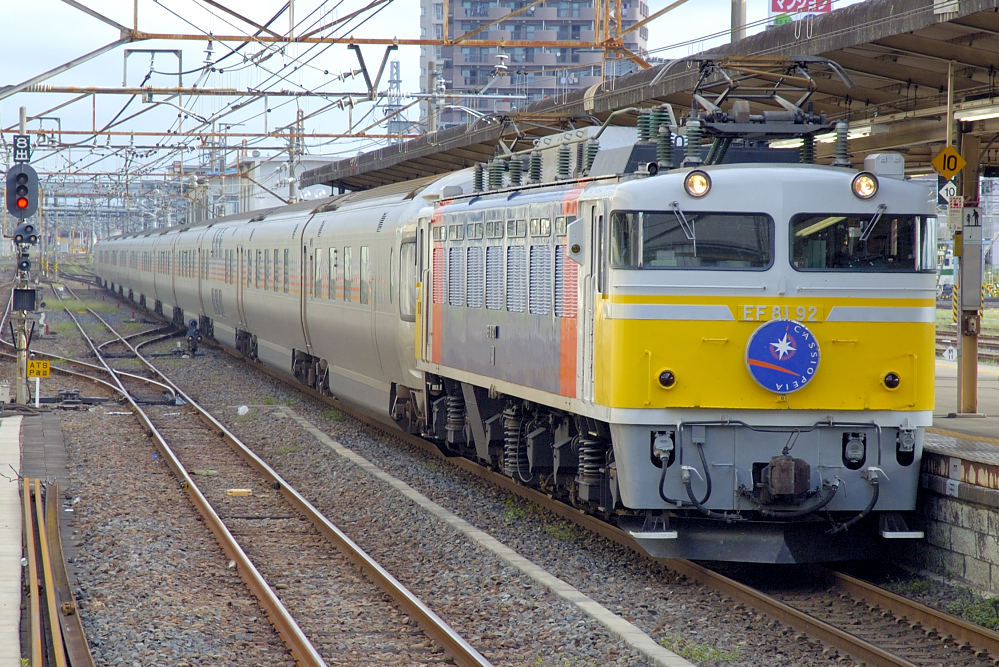
EF81 92 (second batch) in Cassiopeia livery in September 2007

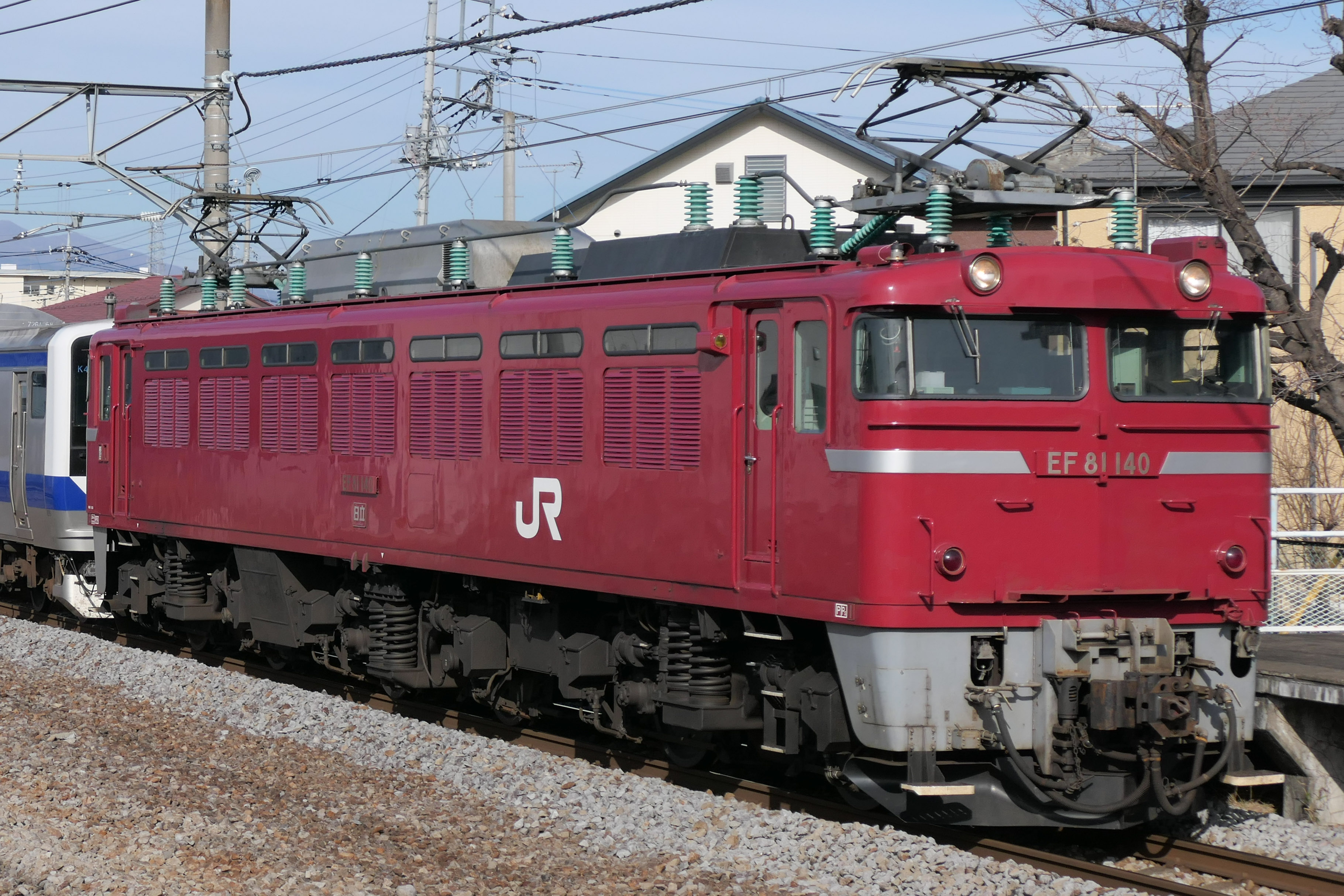
EF81 140 (third batch) in February 2021

== EF81-300 ==
Four locomotives were built between 1973 and 1975 by Hitachi with unpainted corrugated stainless steel bodies for use on services through the undersea Kanmon Tunnel to Kyushu. In 1978, locomotives EF81 301 and 302 were transferred to the Joban Line, and received the standard JNR AC/DC livery of pale red.

As of 1 April 2016, only one Class EF81-300 locomotive remained in service, EF81 303, operated by JR Freight and based at Moji Depot.

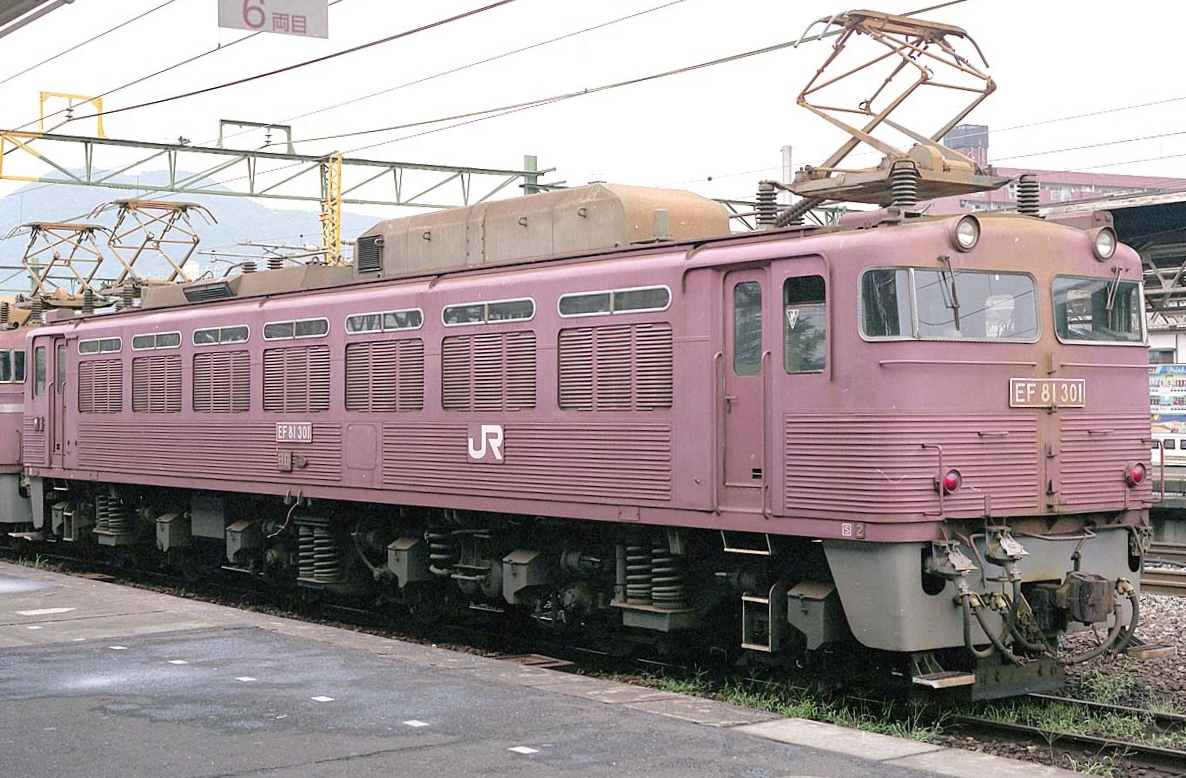
EF81 301 in light red livery in August 1992

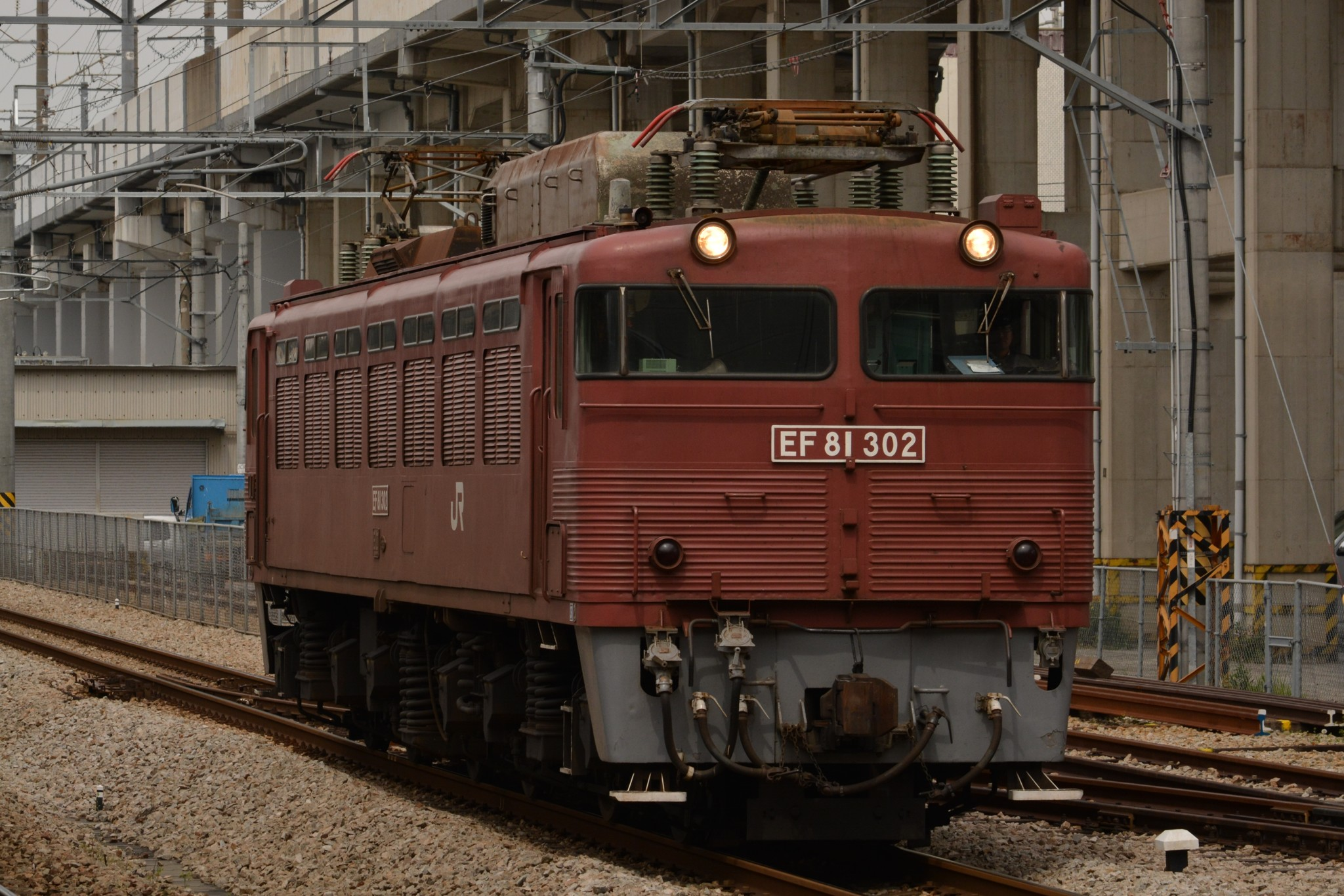
EF81 302 in light red livery in March 2013

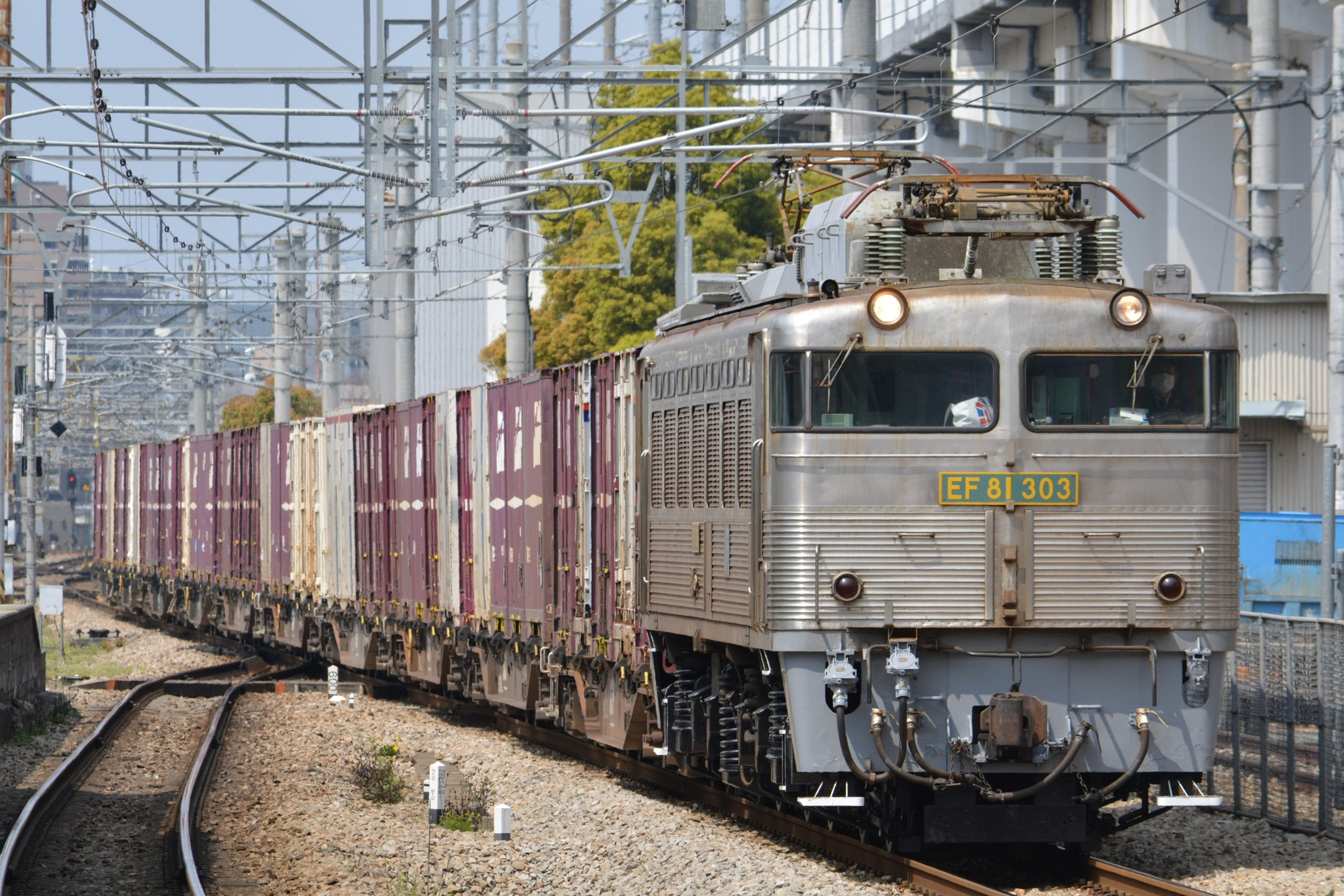
EF81 303 in unpainted stainless steel livery in March 2013

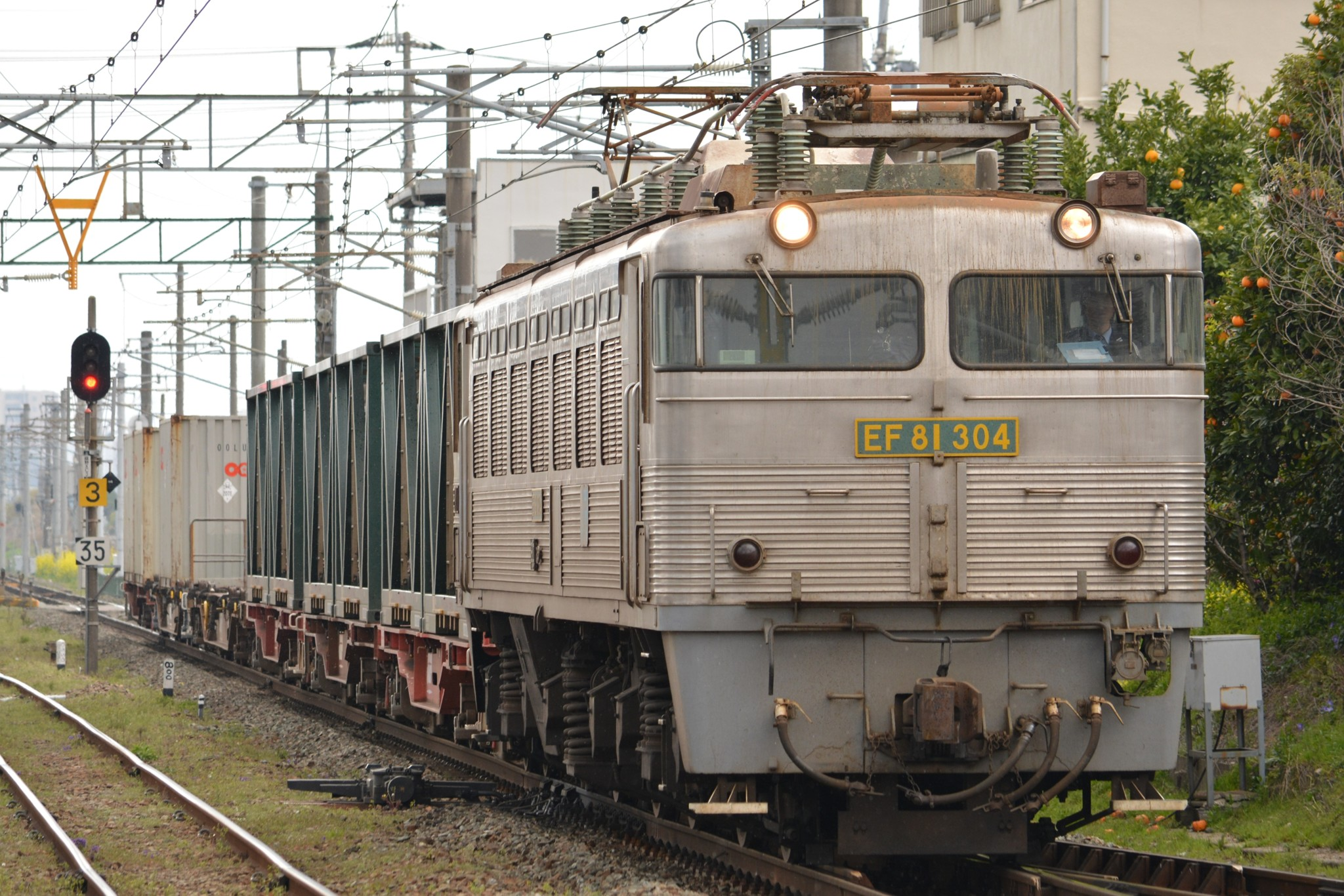
EF81 304 in unpainted stainless steel livery in March 2013

== EF81-400 ==
14 locomotives were built in 1986 and 1987 and to replace ageing Class EF30 hauling services through the Kanmon Tunnel. Although some locomotives operating on a few "Blue Train" services served some railway lines in Kyushu, in particular sections of the Kagoshima Main Line and the Nippō Main Line as well as the entire Nagasaki Main Line.

Locomotives EF81 409 to 414 were withdrawn between March 1996 and December 2010.

As of 1 April 2016, three Class EF81-400 locomotives remained in service, EF81 403/404/406, all operated by JR Freight and based at Moji Depot.

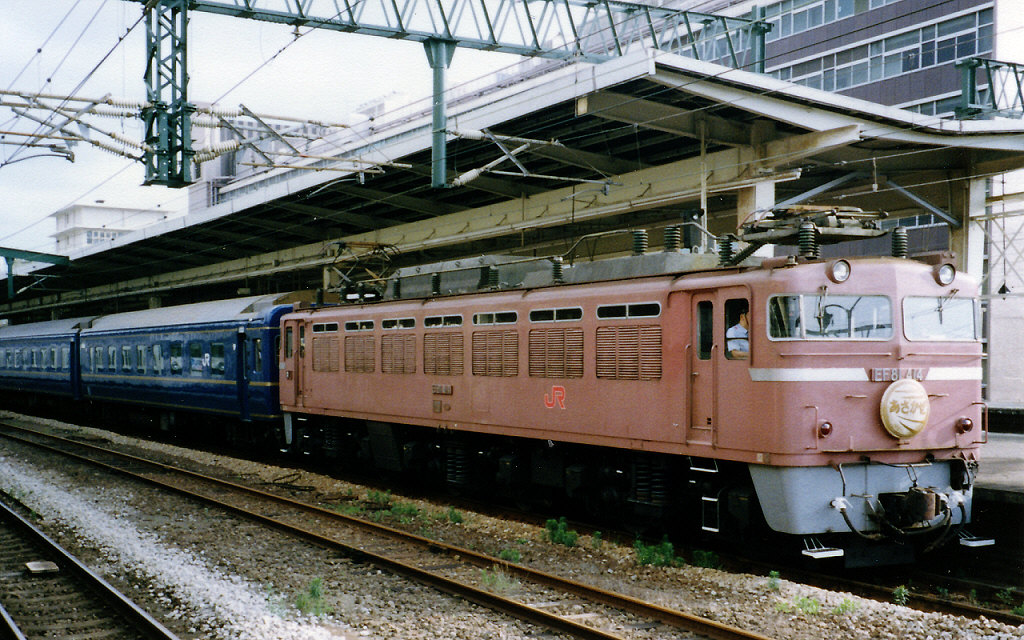
EF81 414 on an Asakaze service in July 1991

== EF81-450 ==
Five locomotives built in 1991 and 1992 for use hauling freight services through the Kanmon Tunnel. Locomotives EF81 451 and 452 have modern-style headlight clusters.

As of 1 April 2016, all five Class EF81-450 locomotives remained in service, operated by JR Freight and based at Moji Depot.

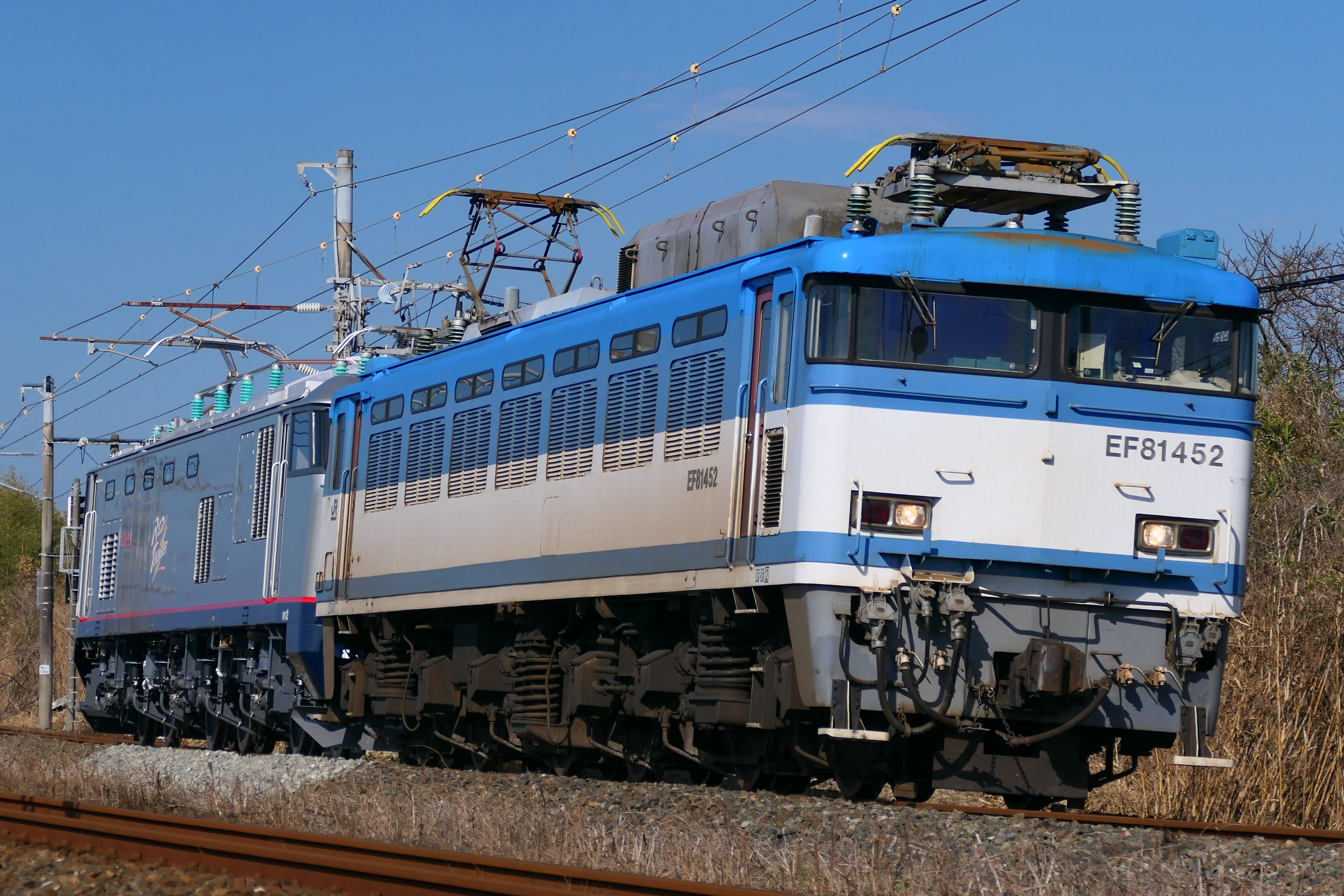
EF81 452 in February 2024

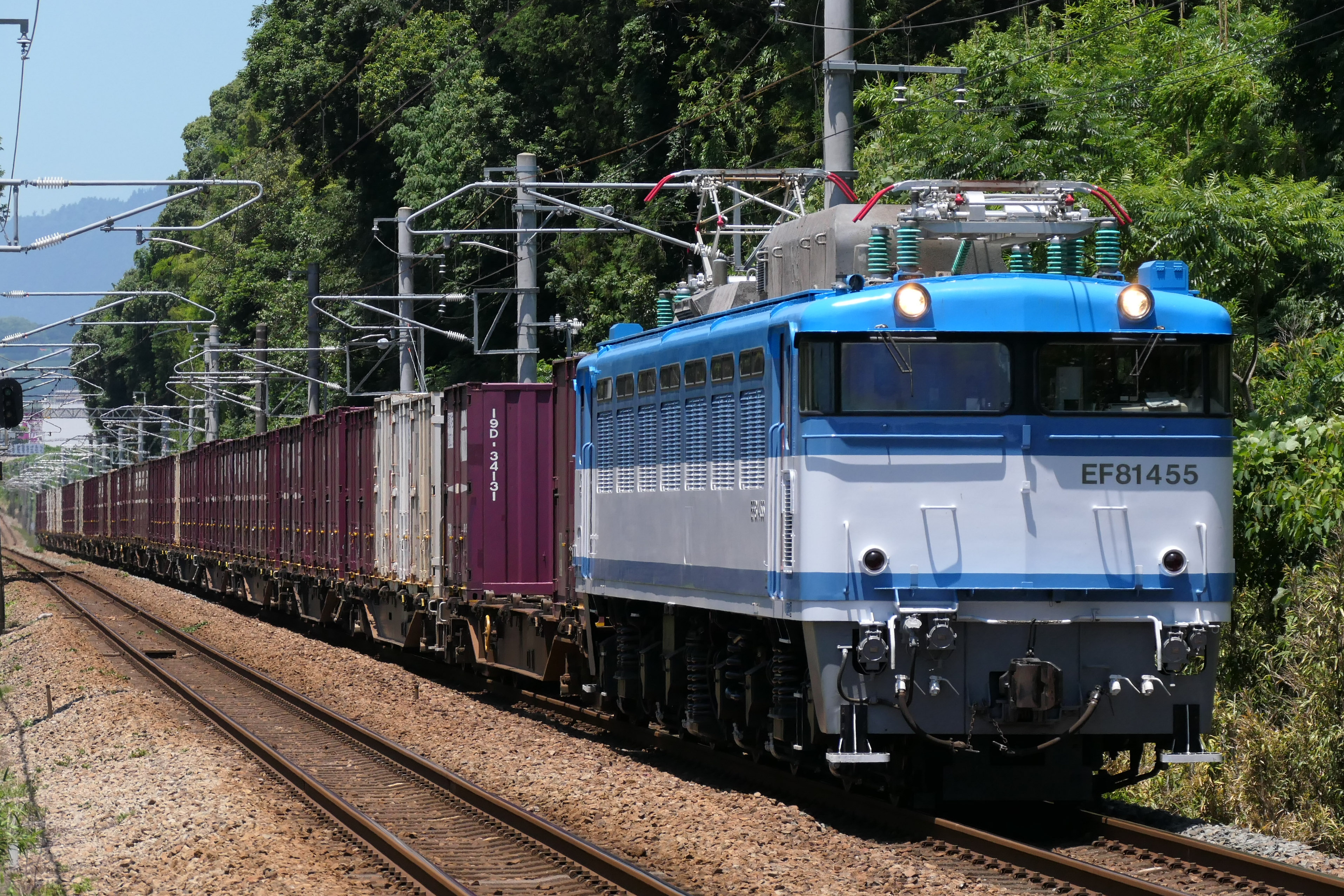
EF81 455 in June 2019

== EF81-500 ==
Three locomotives, EF81 501 to 503, were built by Hitachi in 1989 for JR Freight for use on freight services along the Sea of Japan coastal route.

As of 1 April 2016, all three Class EF81-500 locomotives remained in service, operated by JR Freight and based at Moji Depot.

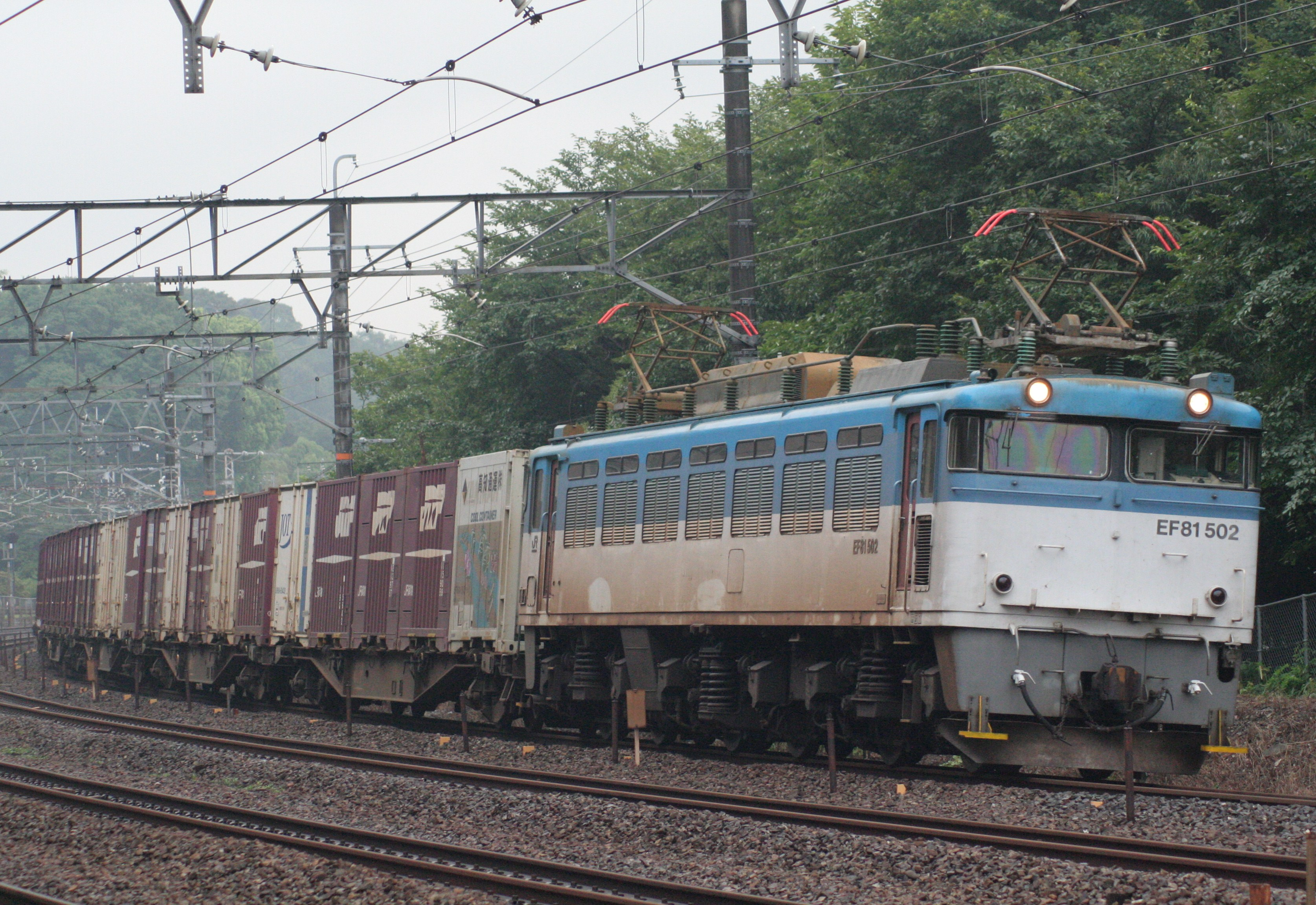
EF81 502 in August 2010

== EF81-600 ==
These are former Class EF81-0 locomotives renumbered from May 2012 by JR Freight to differentiate them from locomotives fitted with driving recording units mandated for operations over 100 km/h (60 mph).

As of 1 April 2016, 14 Class EF81-600 locomotives remained in service, operated by JR Freight and based at Moji and Toyama Depots.

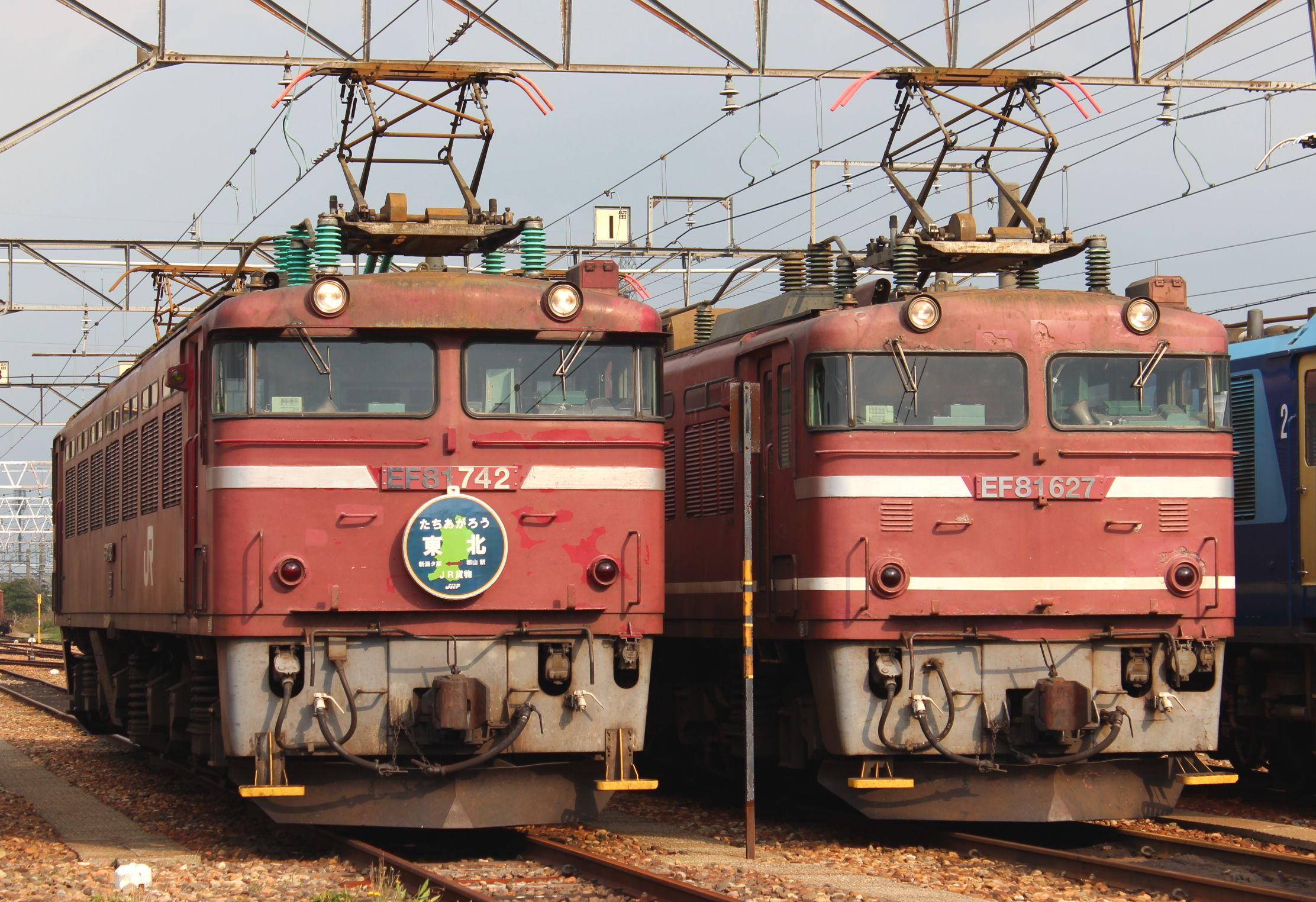
JR Freight EF81 742 and EF81 627 in October 2012

== Livery variations ==
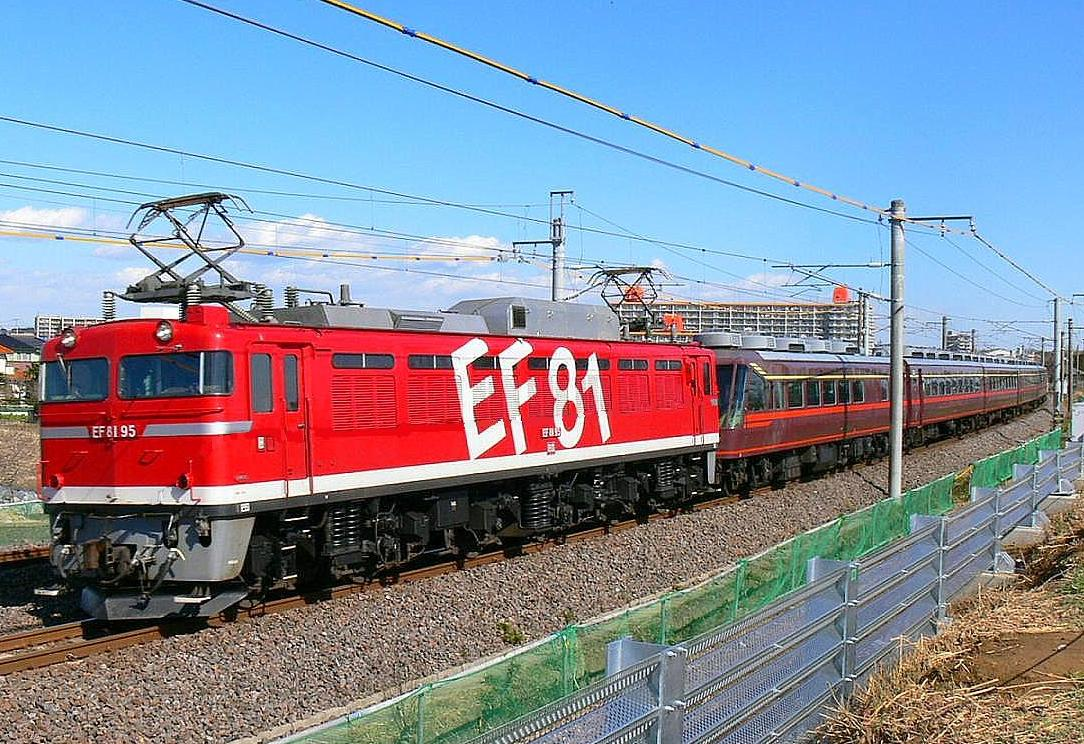
JR East EF81 95 in "Super Express Rainbow" livery in February 2007

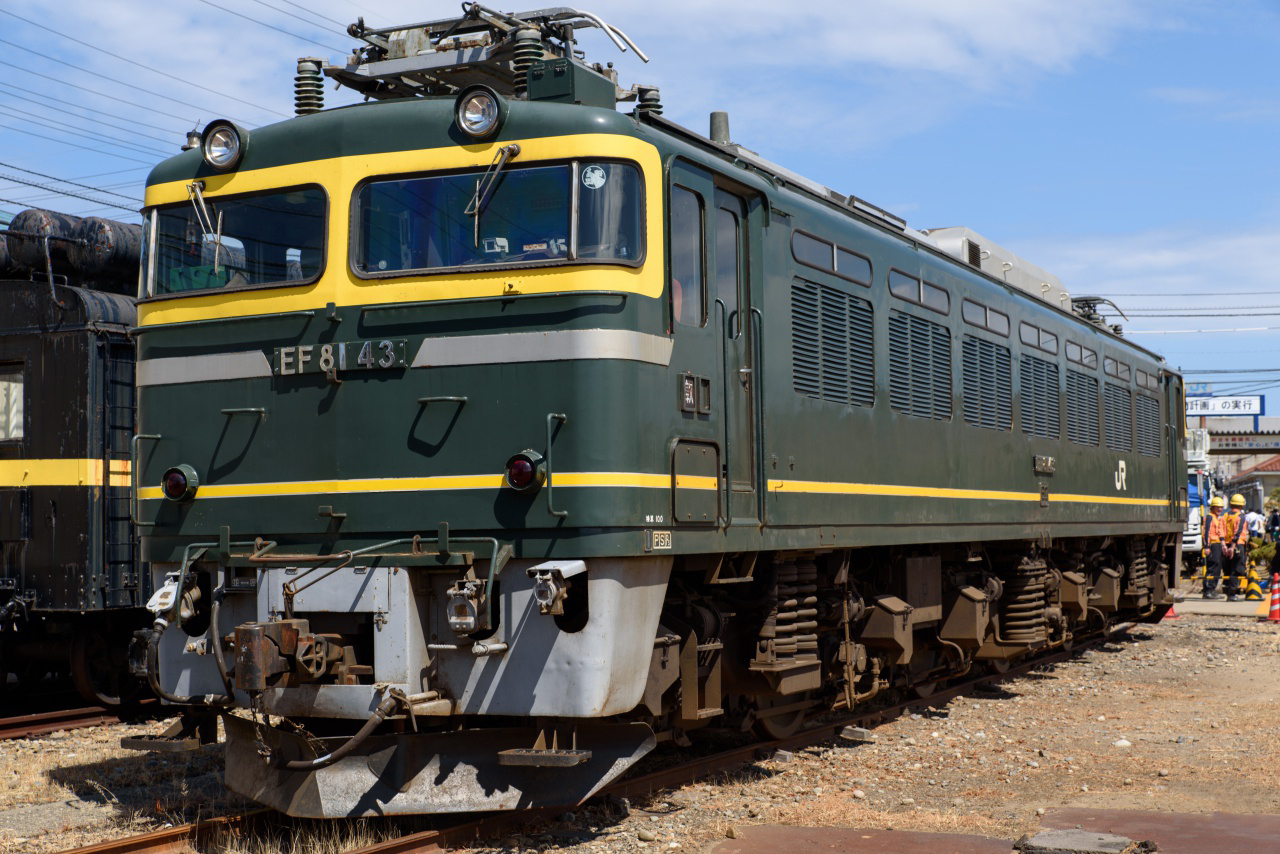
JR West EF81 43 in Twilight Express livery in August 2016

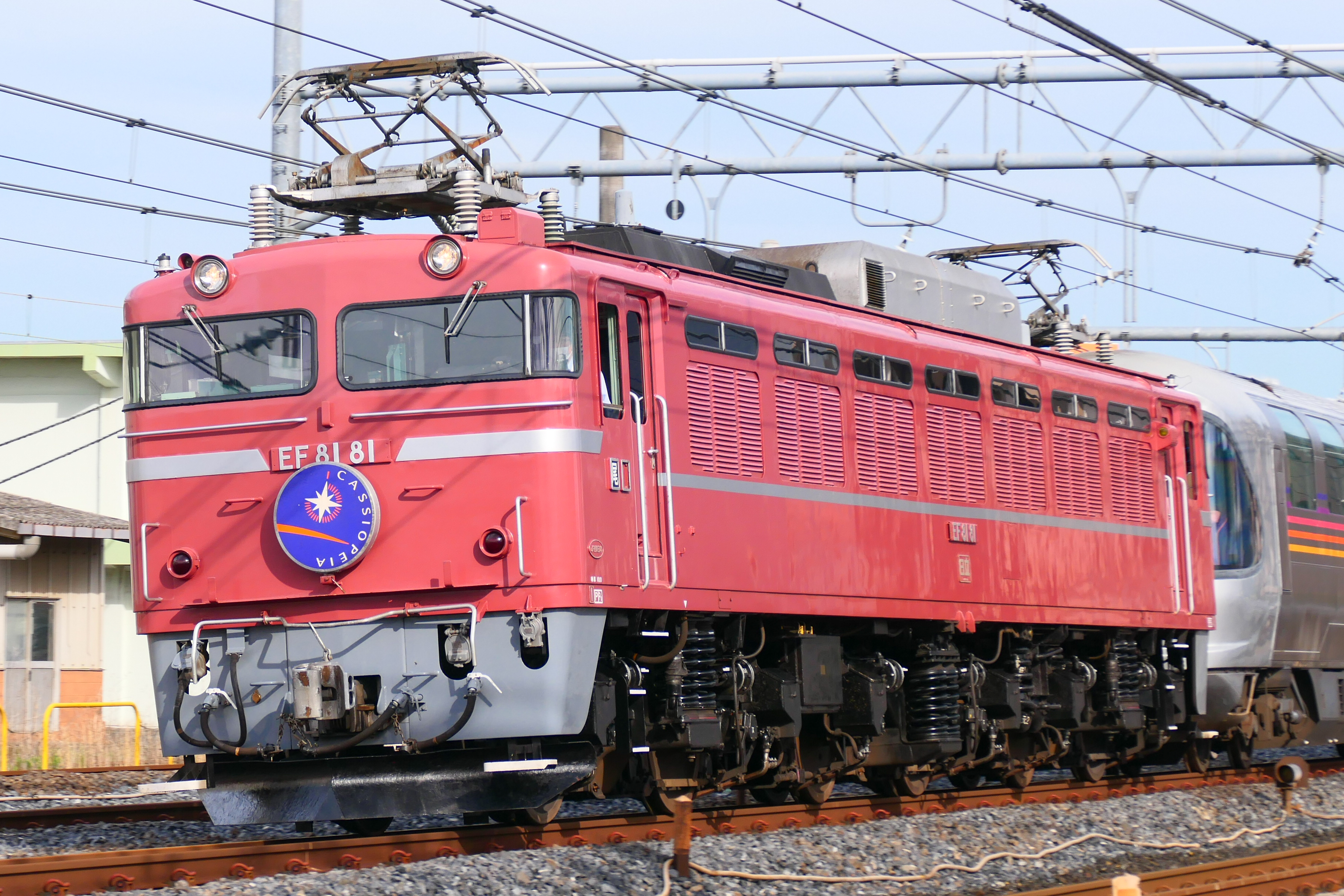
JR East EF81 81 in imperial train livery with silver bodyline stripe in May 2022

In August 2014, JR East Tabata-based locomotive EF81 81 was repainted into a JNR-period imperial train locomotive livery, consisting of "rose pink" (Red No. 13) with silver bodyside stripe.

== Preserved examples ==
As of April 2016, four members of the class are preserved.

- EF81 10: Preserved at the Hakuba Mini Train Park in Hakuba, Nagano (front section only).
- EF81 63: Kept at JR Freight's training centre in Shinagawa, Tokyo. (Not on public display)
- EF81 103: Preserved at the Kyoto Railway Museum in Twilight Express green livery.
- EF81 138: Preserved privately in Chikusei, Ibaraki, since December 2015.
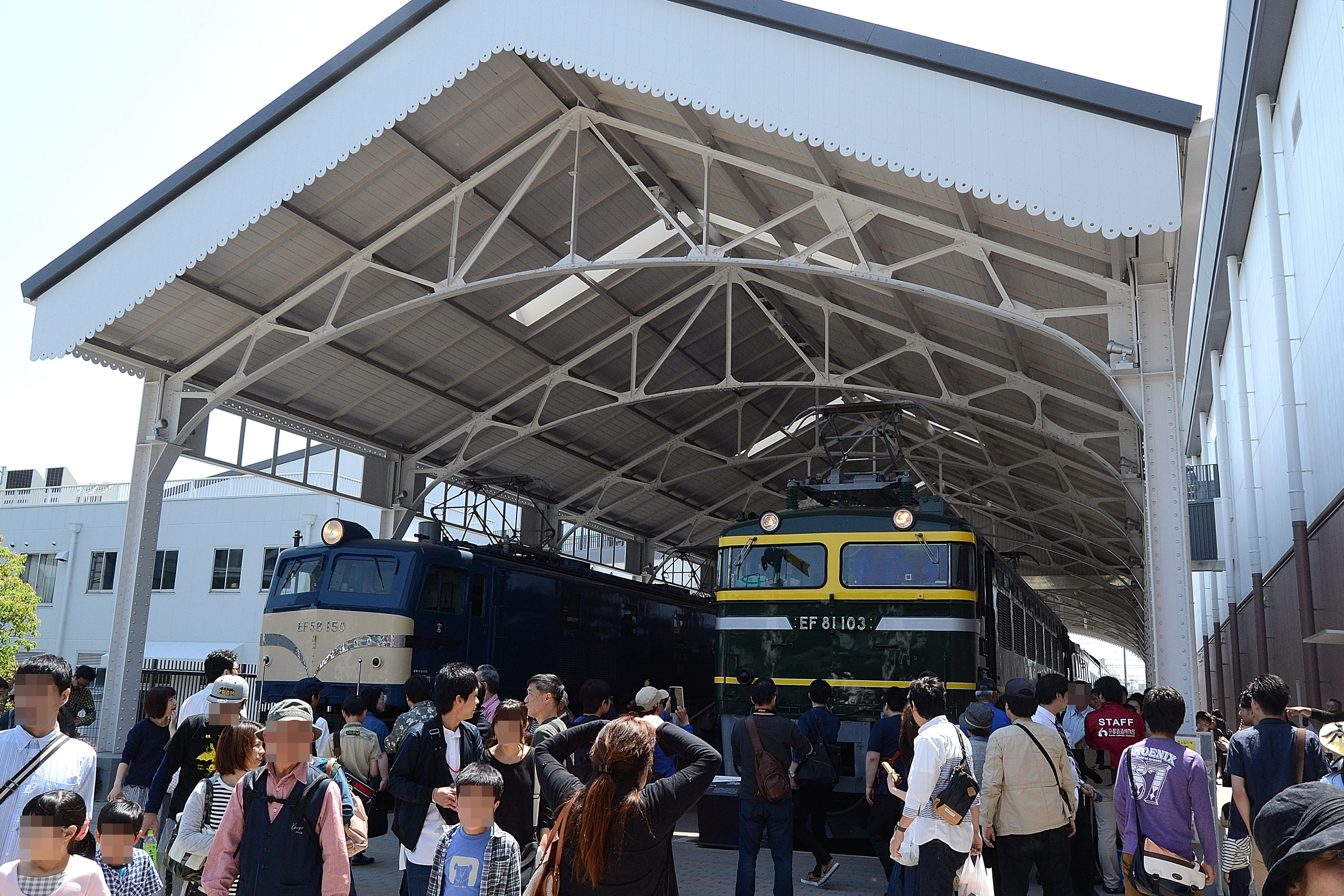
Twilight Express EF81 103 (right) in the Twilight Plaza zone at the Kyoto Railway Museum in May 2016

== See also ==
- Japan Railways locomotive numbering and classification
