= Asakaze =

Japanese sleeper train service

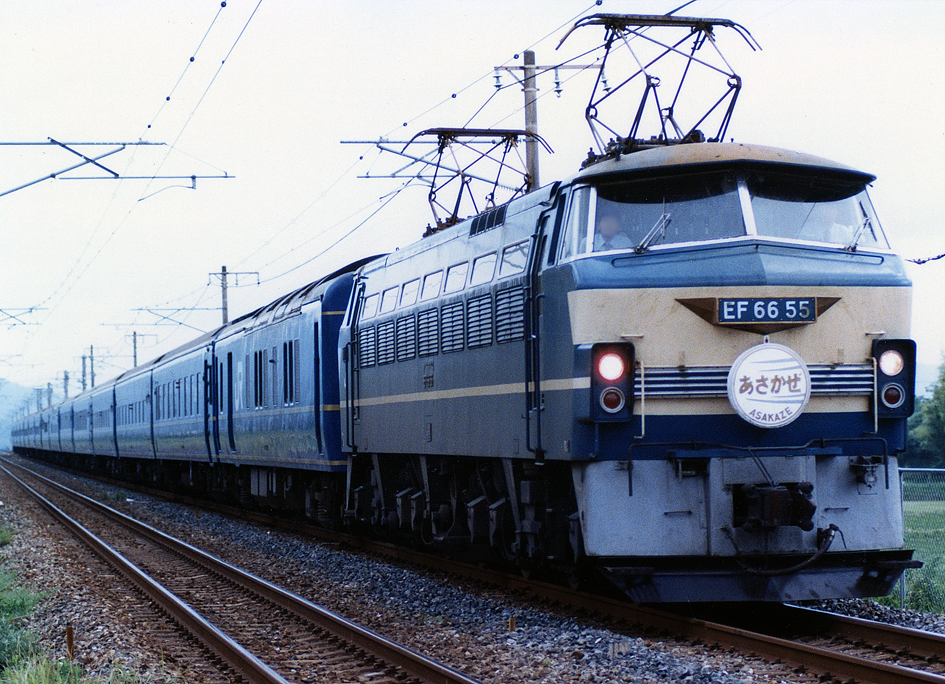
- Asakaze service hauled by an EF66 in 1988

Overview
- Service type: Blue Train Limited express
- First service: 1956
- Last service: 2005
- Current operator: JR West

Route
- Lines used: Tokaido Main Line, Sanyo Main Line

Technical
- Rolling stock: 24 + 14 series sleeper coaches
- Track gauge: 1,067 mm (3 ft 6 in)
- Electrification: 1,500 V DC

The Asakaze (あさかぜ) was a limited express sleeper train service operated by Japanese National Railways (JNR) and later by West Japan Railway Company (JR West), which ran from Tokyo to Hakata in Fukuoka Prefecture, Japan.

The Asakaze was discontinued from the start of the revised timetable on 1 March 2005.

== Rolling stock ==
The train was formed of 14 and 24 series sleeping cars hauled by an EF66 electric locomotive between Tokyo and Shimonoseki.

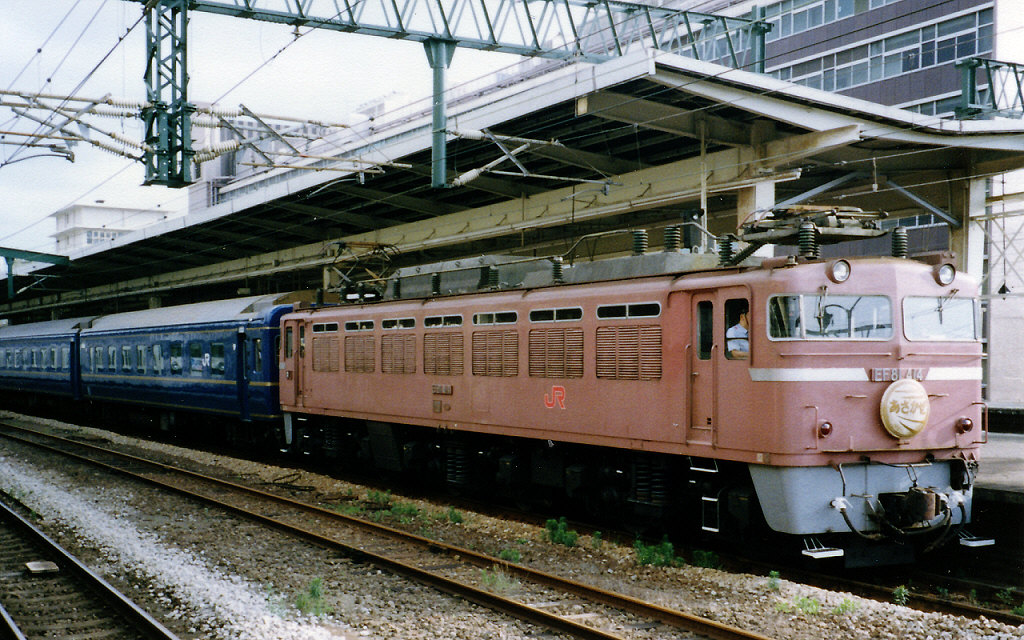
Asakaze service at Hakata Station, hauled by EF81-400 locomotive, July 1991

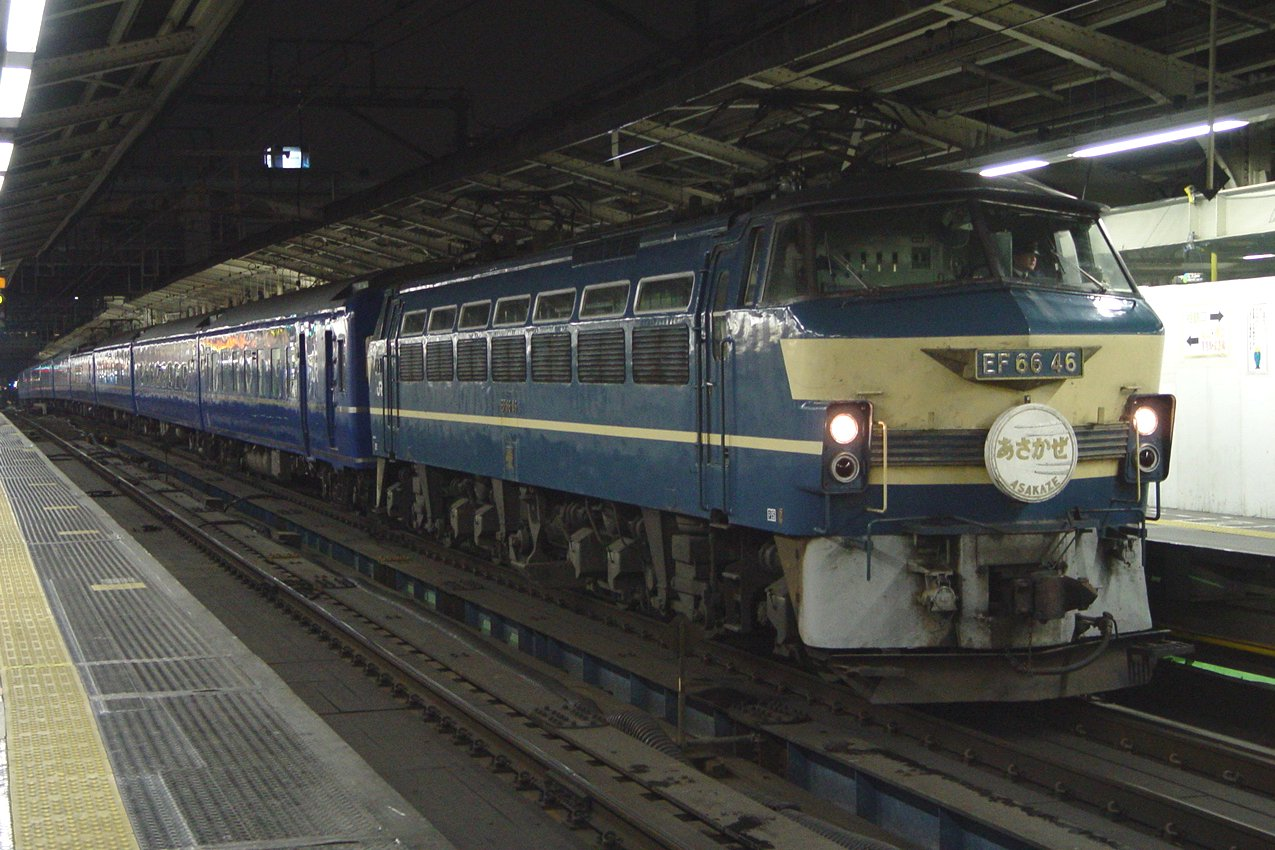
Down Asakaze service hauled by EF66 46, February 2003

== History ==
The Asakaze service commenced on 19 November 1956, operating between Tokyo and Hakata. In October 1970, Tokyo to Shimonoseki, The Asakaze services were also introduced, and the Tokyo to Hakata services were discontinued in December 1994.

The remaining Asakaze services were discontinued in 2005, with the final runs occurring on 28 February.

== See also ==
- List of named passenger trains of Japan
- Blue Train (Japan)
