= Naha (train) =

Japanese sleeper train service (1968–2008)

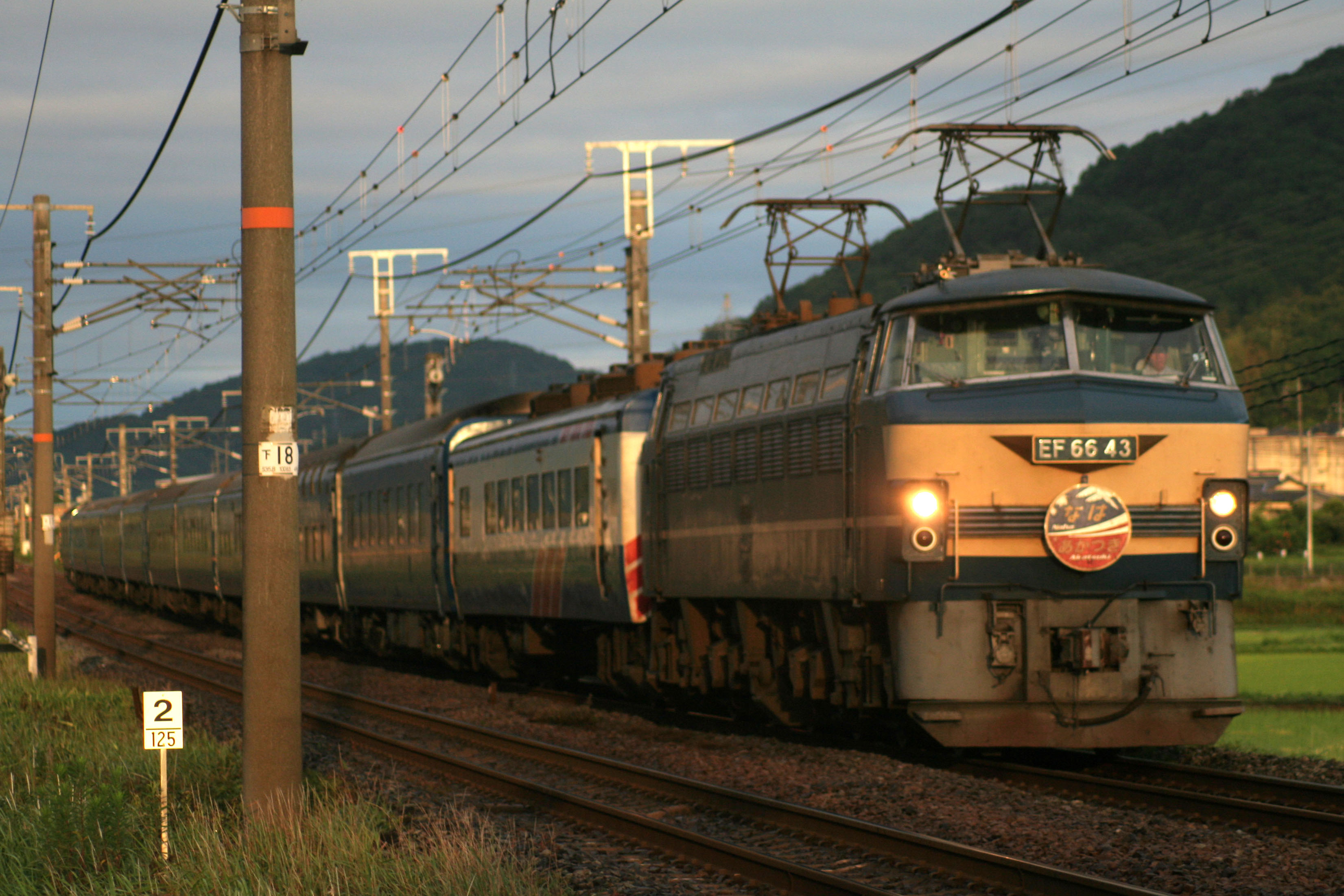
- Naha/Akatsuki

Overview
- Service type: Limited express
- First service: 1968
- Last service: 2008
- Current operator: JR Kyushu

The Naha (なは) was a sleeper train service operated in Japan by Kyushu Railway Company (JR Kyushu), which ran from Kyoto to Kumamoto, passing through Osaka, Okayama, Kokura, and Hakata. It once extended to Nishi-Kagoshima. The journey between Kyoto and Kumamoto was 801.4 kilometers (498.0 mi) and took approximately 11 1/2 hours.

The Naha was coupled to the Akatsuki between Kyoto Station and Tosu Station.

Due to falling passenger numbers, both the Naha and Akatsuki services ceased following the March 15, 2008, timetable revision.

== Schedule ==
Timetable of Naha, as of March 2008 before its discontinuation:

km	Station	Train 31 for Kumamoto		Train 32 for Kyoto	
0.0	Kyoto	20:02	Dp	7:53	Ar
39.0	Shin-Osaka	20:28	Ar	7:24	Dp
39.0	Shin-Osaka	20:35	Dp	7:24	Ar
42.8	Osaka	20:41	Ar	7:19	Dp
42.8	Osaka	20:47	Dp	7:17	Ar
73.4	Sannomiya	21:10	Ar	6:53	Dp
73.4	Sannomiya	21:11	Dp	6:52	Ar
130.7	Himeji	21:53	Ar	6:08	Dp
130.7	Himeji	21:55	Dp	6:06	Ar
219.3	Okayama	23:00	Ar	5:03	Dp
219.3	Okayama	23:02	Dp	5:01	Ar
235.2	Kurashiki	23:16	Ar	4:48	Dp
235.2	Kurashiki	23:16	Dp	4:47	Ar
277.6	Fukuyama	23:49	Ar	4:16	Dp
277.6	Fukuyama	23:50	Dp	4:16	Ar
297.7	Onomichi	0:07	Ar	↑	
297.7	Onomichi	0:07	Dp	↑	
309.2	Mihara	0:20	Ar	↑	
309.2	Mihara	0:21	Dp	↑	
535.1	Shin-Yamaguchi	↓		0:49	Dp
535.1	Shin-Yamaguchi	↓		0:48	Ar
560.4	Ube	↓		0:27	Dp
560.4	Ube	↓		0:27	Ar
570.2	Asa	↓		0:18	Dp
570.2	Asa	↓		0:17	Ar
604.0	Shimonoseki	4:22	Ar	23:49	Dp
604.0	Shimonoseki	4:29	Dp	23:44	Ar
610.3	Moji	4:36	Ar	23:37	Dp
610.3	Moji	4:42	Dp	23:31	Ar
615.8	Kokura	4:49	Ar	23:24	Dp
615.8	Kokura	4:50	Dp	23:24	Ar
629.7	Kurosaki	5:04	Ar	23:12	Dp
629.7	Kurosaki	5:04	Dp	23:12	Ar
683.0	Hakata	5:52	Ar	22:31	Dp
683.0	Hakata	5:53	Dp	22:30	Ar
711.6	Tosu	6:17	Ar	22:07	Dp
711.6	Tosu	6:23	Dp	21:32	Ar
718.7	Kurume	6:30	Ar	21:24	Dp
718.7	Kurume	6:31	Dp	21:24	Ar
752.3	Ōmuta	6:56	Ar	20:58	Dp
752.3	Ōmuta	6:56	Dp	20:53	Ar
801.4	Kumamoto	7:36	Ar	20:14	Dp
