= JR Freight Class EF500 =

Japanese electric locomotive

Class EF500
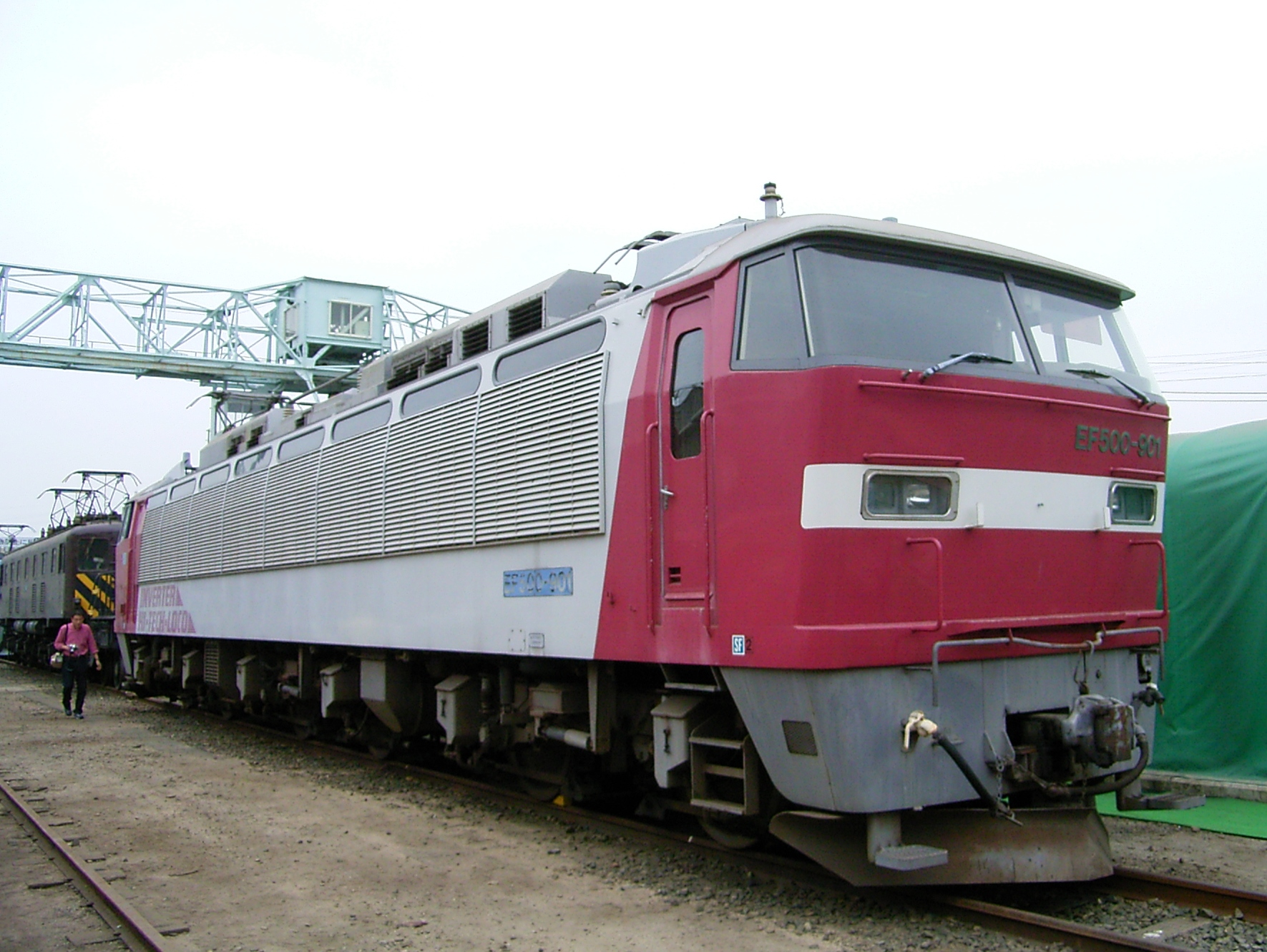
- EF500-901 at Hiroshima Depot, October 2006
Type and origin
- Power type: Electric
- Builder: Kawasaki Heavy Industries, Mitsubishi Electric
- Build date: 1990
- Total produced: 1
Specifications
- Configuration
  - UIC: Bo-Bo-Bo
- Gauge: 1,067 mm (3 ft 6 in)
- Wheel diameter: 1,120 mm (44.09 in)
- Length: 20,000 mm (65 ft 7 3/8 in)
- Width: 2,905 mm (9 ft 6 3/8 in)
- Height: 4,280 mm (14 ft 1/2 in)
- Loco weight: 100.8 t (99.2 long tons; 111.1 short tons)
- Electric system/s: 20 kV AC at 50/60 Hz overhead wire
- Current pickup: pantograph
- Traction motors: AC
Performance figures
- Maximum speed: 120 km/h (75 mph)
- Power output: 6 MW (8,000 hp)
- Tractive effort: 26,600 kgf (59,000 lbf)
Career
- Operators: JR Freight
- Number in class: 1
- First run: 1990
- Withdrawn: 29 March 2002
- Disposition: Withdrawn, preserved

The Class EF500 (EF500形) is a withdrawn prototype Bo-Bo-Bo wheel arrangement multi-voltage AC/DC electric locomotive formerly operated by JR Freight in Japan.

Intended as a prototype for a new fleet of high-power electric locomotives to haul freight trains northward from Tokyo to Hokkaido, the sole member of the class, EF500-901, was built jointly by Kawasaki Heavy Industries and Mitsubishi Electric, and delivered to Shin-Tsurumi Depot in August 1990. The design was broadly based on the Class EF200 locomotives built for Tokaido Main Line freight duties west of Tokyo. Following initial test-running, the locomotive underwent long-term feasibility testing on freight services on the Tohoku Main Line. However, the locomotive fell foul of newly introduced government guidelines covering high-frequency electromagnetic noise emissions, and so fleet production was deemed unfeasible. JR Freight instead opted for the Class EH500 and Class EF510 locomotive designs.

EF500-901 was transferred to Sendai Depot in 1996, but subsequently saw little use. It was formally withdrawn on 29 March 2002. The locomotive is stored at JR Freight's Hiroshima Depot.

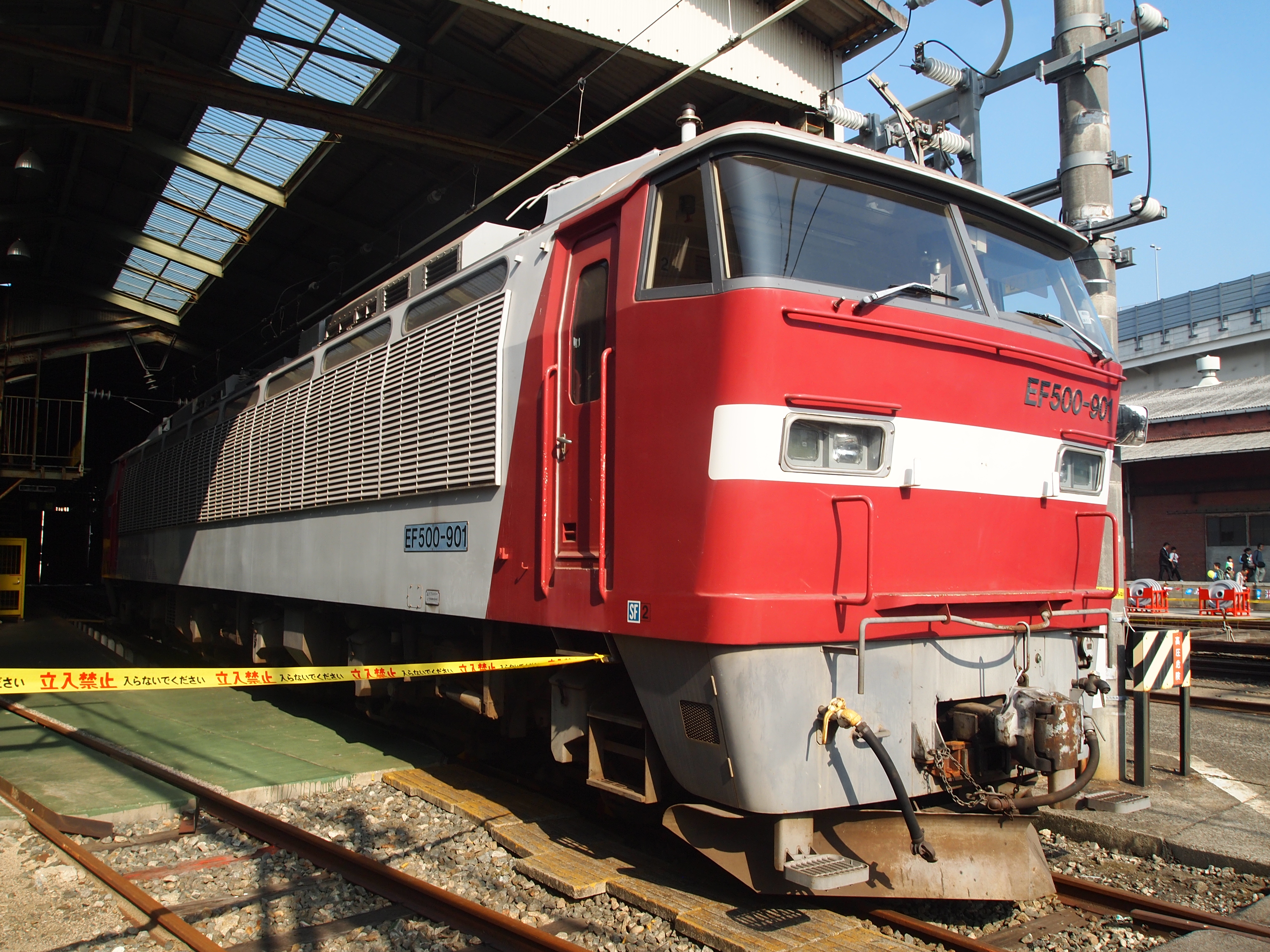
EF500-901 on display at Hiroshima Depot open day in October 2015

== Classification ==
The EF500 classification for this locomotive type is explained below. As with previous locomotive designs, the prototype is numbered EF500-901.

- E: Electric locomotive
- F: Six driving axles
- 500: AC/DC locomotive with AC motors

== See also ==
- JR Freight Class ED500, another experimental electric locomotive
