= Indian locomotive class WAG-6B/C =

Electric rail transportation in India

Indian locomotive class WAG–6
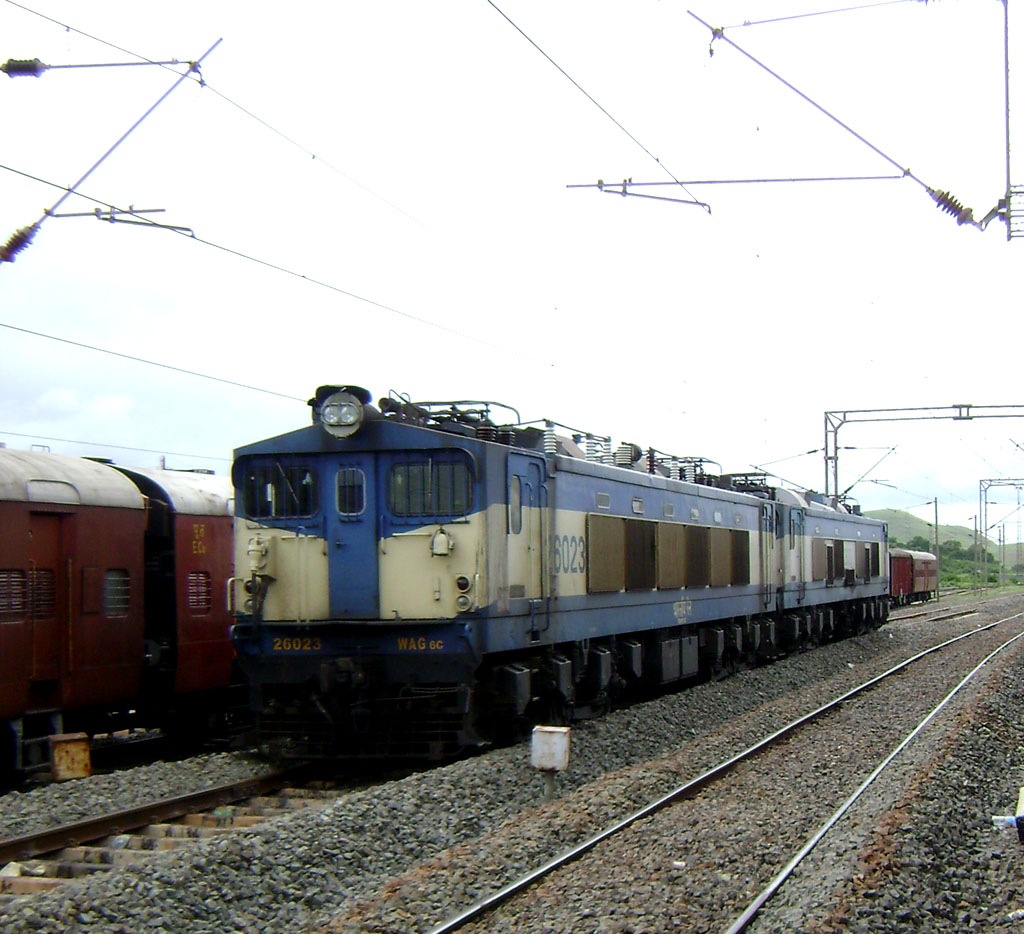
- VSKP based WAG-6C locos at Koraput.
Type and origin
- Power type: Electric
- Designer: Hitachi
- Builder: Hitachi
- Order number: 85/RSF/459/1/(LT-33)
- Build date: 1988
- Total produced: WAG-6B: 6; WAG-6C: 6
Specifications
- Configuration
  - UIC: WAG-6B: Bo'Bo'Bo'; WAG-6C: Co'Co
  - Commonwealth: WAG-6B: Bo-Bo-Bo; WAG-6C: Co-Co
- Gauge: 5 ft 6 in (1,676 mm)
- Bogies: 2 axle double stage field excitation
- Wheel diameter: New: 1,140 mm (3 ft 9 in); Half-worn: 1,102 mm (3 ft 7 1/2 in); Full-worn:1,065 mm (3 ft 6 in)
- Wheelbase: WAG-6B:2,200 mm (7 ft 3 in); WAG-6C:2,800 mm (9 ft 2 in)
- Length
  - Over beams: 20,940 mm (68 ft 8 in)
  - Over body: 19,640 mm (64 ft 5 in)
- Width: 3,000 mm (9 ft 10 in)
- Height: 4,235 mm (13 ft 11 in)
- Frame type: 2 axle double stage field excitation
- Axle load: 20.5 tonnes (20.2 long tons; 22.6 short tons) ±2%
- Loco weight: 123 tonnes (121 long tons; 136 short tons) ±1%
- Sandbox cap.: 40L
- Power supply: 110 V DC
- Electric system/s: 25 kV 50 Hz AC Overhead
- Current pickup: pantograph
- Traction motors: WAG-6B:HS-15556-OIR; WAG-6C:HS-15256-UIR
- MU working: 2 units
- Loco brake: Air, Dynamic braking
- Train brakes: Air
- Compressor: 1,580 L (348 imp gal; 417 US gal)
- Safety systems: Slip control, Over voltage relay, No volt relay, Earth fault relay, Low pressure governor, Train parting alarms, and Brake cylinder cutoff valve
Performance figures
- Maximum speed: 100 km/h (62 mph)
- Power output
  - Starting: Max: 6,200 hp (4,620 kW)
  - 1 hour: Max: 6,110 hp (4,560 kW)
  - Continuous: Max: 6,050 hp (4,510 kW)
- Tractive effort
  - Starting: 45,000 kgf (440 kN)
  - 1 hour: 32,000 kgf (310 kN)
  - Continuous: 32,000 kgf (310 kN)
- Factor of adh.: 0.25
Career
- Operators: Indian Railways
- Numbers: WAG-6B:26010-26015; WAG-6C:26020-26025
- Locale: Kothavalasa–Kirandul line
- Delivered: December 1987 (first unit); January 1988 (remaining 5)
- First run: 1988
- Retired: November 2023
- Preserved: 1 earmarked from each variant
- Scrapped: From 2007 to 2015
- Current owner: Indian Railways
- Disposition: All units withdrawn

The Indian locomotive class WAG-6B/C is a class of 25 kV AC electric locomotives that was developed in the 1988 by Hitachi for Indian Railways. The model name stands for broad gauge (W), AC Current (A), Goods (G) engine, 6th generation (6) Second/Third variant (B/C). They entered service in 1988. A total of 12 WAG-6 (6 B variant and 6 C variant) were built at Hitachi, Japan between 1987 and 1988. they along with WAG-6A were the most powerful locomotives in India until the arrival of the WAG-9 class.

All locomotives of this class have been withdrawn from service, with one unit from each variant earmarked for preservation.

== History ==
The history of WAG-6A begins in early 1980s with the aim of addressing the shortcomings of the previous WAG-1, WAG-2, WAG-3, WAG-4 and WAG-5 classes and remove steam locomotives from IR by a target date of 1990. The WAG-5 were a great successes but these locomotives were based on 1960s technology and fast became underpowered for the expanding Indian railways. So Indian Railways decided to look for a new locomotive. At that time during the 1980s, Thyristor controller was vastly used by locomotive in many European rail networks while 3 Phase AC technology was still in its infancy. So the Ministry of Railways floated a tender for a 6000 horsepower locomotive with Thyristor control. The following responses were received:

- Hitachi submitted their model with 6000 hp with Bo-Bo-Bo bogies and Thyristor chopper control
- Hitachi also submitted their model with 6000 hp with Co-Co- bogies and Thyristor chopper control
- ASEA submitted their model with 6000 hp with Bo-Bo-Bo bogies and Thyristor chopper control.

Each company submitted their prototypes and Indian Railways designated these prototypes as the WAG-6B class WAG-6C class and WAG-6A class respectively. IR ordered 6 of each class and these were delivered in 1988.

== Specification( WAG 6B, WAG 6C ) ==
- Builder: Hitachi
- Build dates:
  - WAG 6B, 1988
  - WAG 6C, 1988
- Wheel arrangement:
  - WAG 6B, Bo-Bo-Bo
  - WAG 6C, Co-Co
- Traction Motors:
  - (WAG-6B) Hitachi HS 15556-OIR, bogie mounted, force-ventilated, compound-wound, 3200 kg
  - (WAG-6C) Hitachi HS 15256-UIR, axle-hung nose-suspended, force-ventilated, compound-wound, 3650 kg.
- Transformer: (WAG-6B/C) Hitachi AFIC-MS, 6325 kVA.
- Thyristor controller:(WAG-6B/C) 32 CGOIDA thyristors each with 24 DSP2500A diodes. 2x720 A, 850 V.
- Pantographs: (WAG-6B/C) Two Faiveley LV2600

== Locomotive shed ==
- All locomotives of this class have been withdrawn from service.

== See also ==
- Indian Railways
- Rail transport in India § History
- Locomotives of India
- Rail transport in India
