= Co-Co locomotive =

Locomotive wheel arrangement

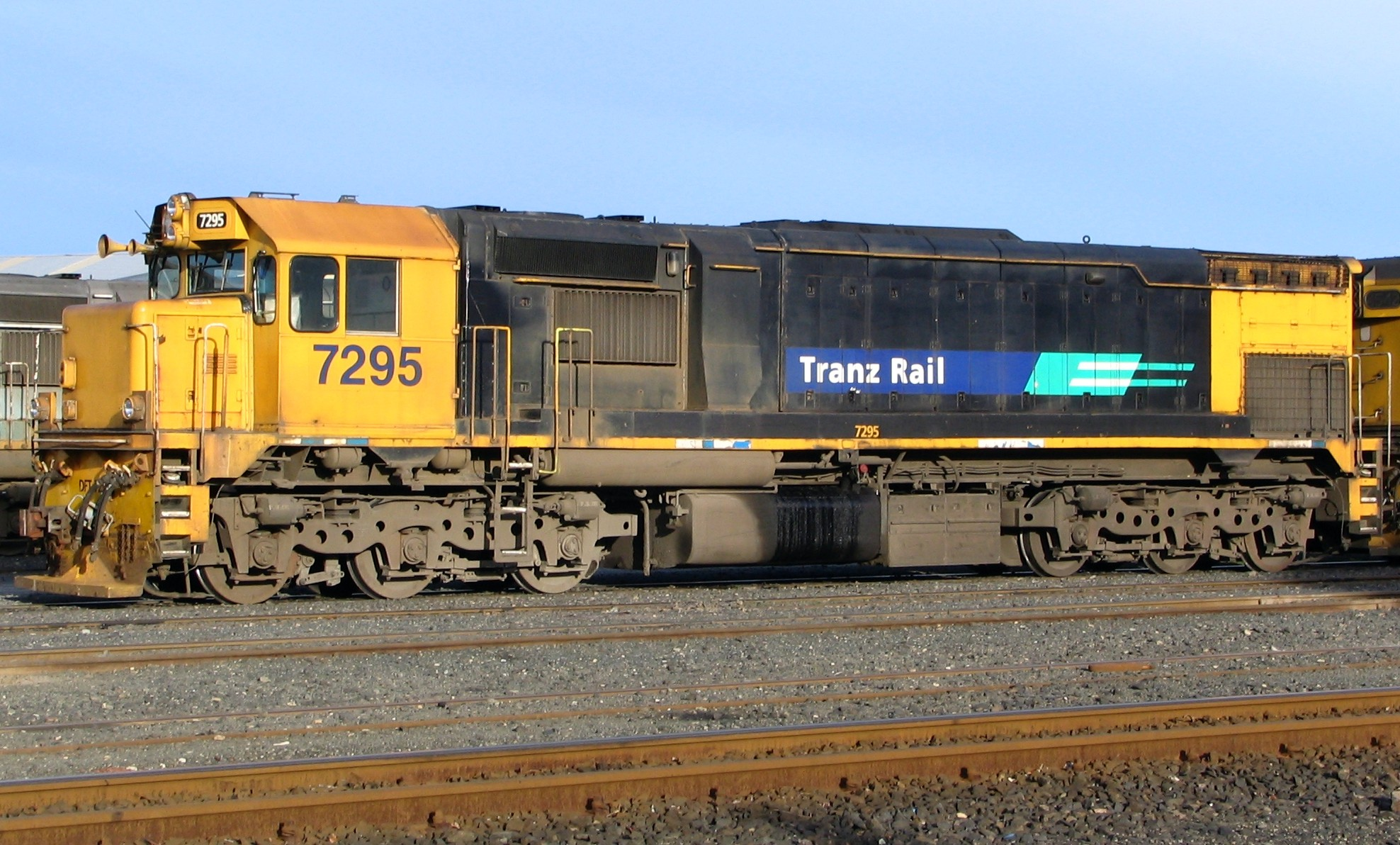
A New Zealand DFT class Co-Co diesel-electric locomotive

Co-Co wheel arrangement

Co-Co is the wheel arrangement for diesel and electric locomotives with two six-wheeled bogies with all axles powered, with a separate traction motor per axle. The equivalent UIC classification (Europe) for this arrangement is Co′Co′, or C-C for AAR (North America).

Co-Cos are most suited to freight work as the extra wheels give them good traction. They are also popular because the greater number of axles results in a lower axle load to the track.

== History ==
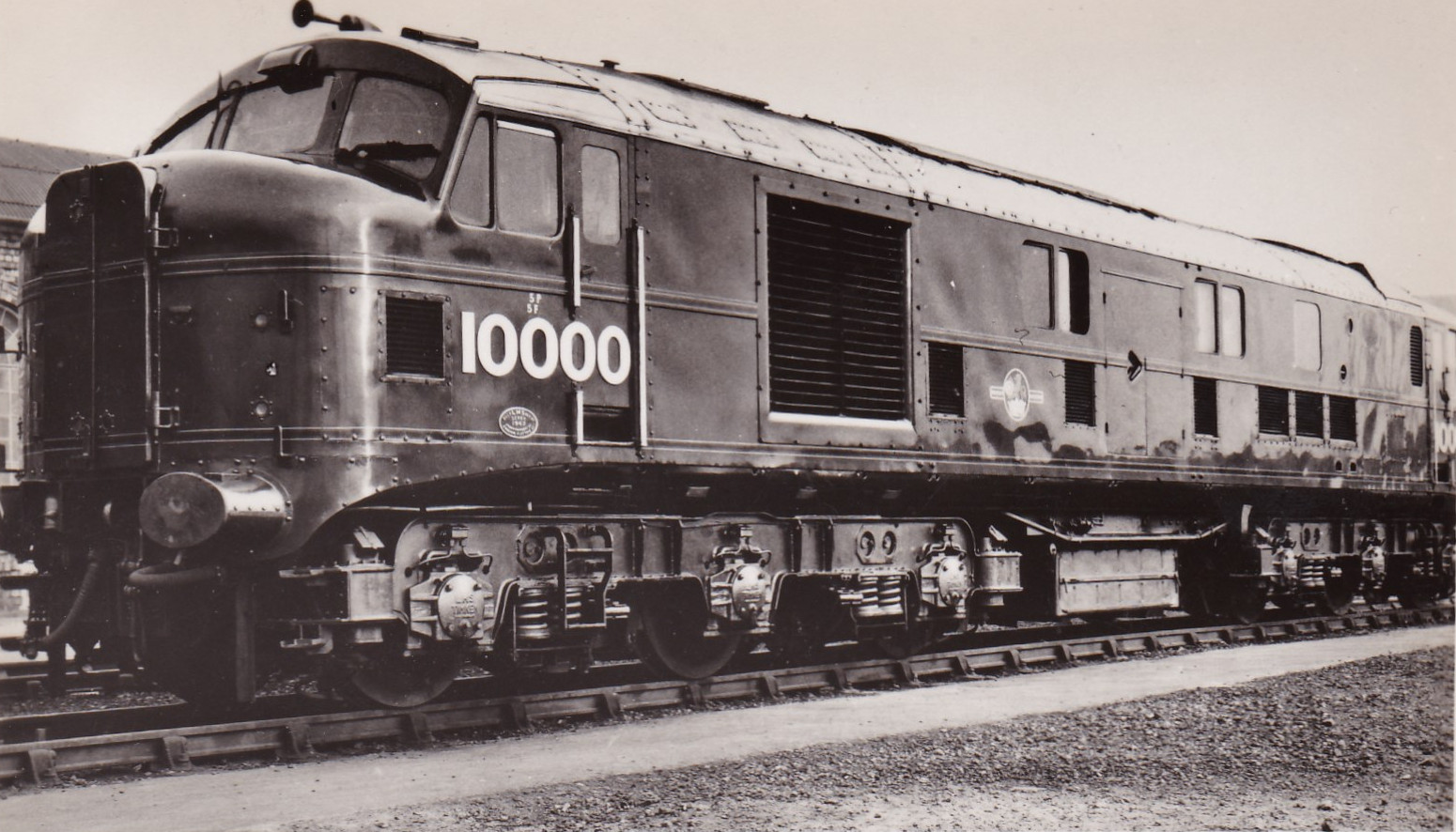
LMS 10000 of 1947

The first mainline diesel-electric locomotives were of Bo-Bo arrangement. As they grew in power and weight, from 1937 the EMD E-units used an A1A-A1A layout with six axles to reduce axle load. After WWII, the British LMS ordered two prototype locomotives with some of the first Co-Co arrangements.

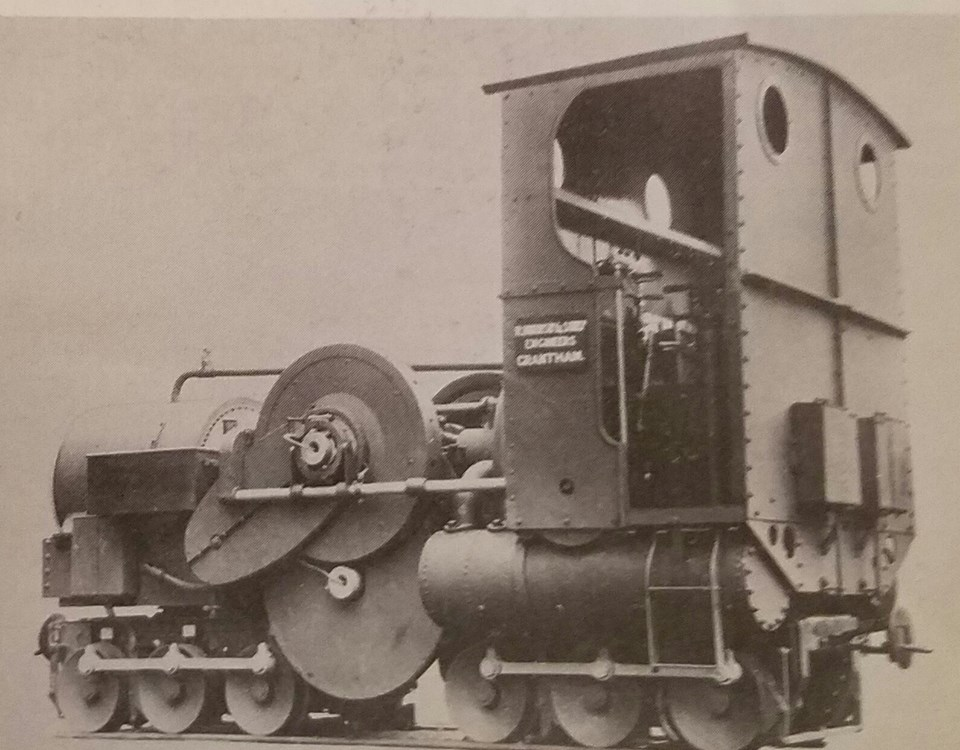
The 1903 Hornsby locomotive

The first C-C design recorded was a narrow-gauge Hornsby opposed-piston Hornsby-Akroyd-engined locomotive of 1903 for the Chattenden and Upnor Railway. There was a two-speed mechanical transmission with drive shafts to the bogies and the axles on each bogie were linked by coupling rods.

== Variants ==
=== Electric locomotives ===
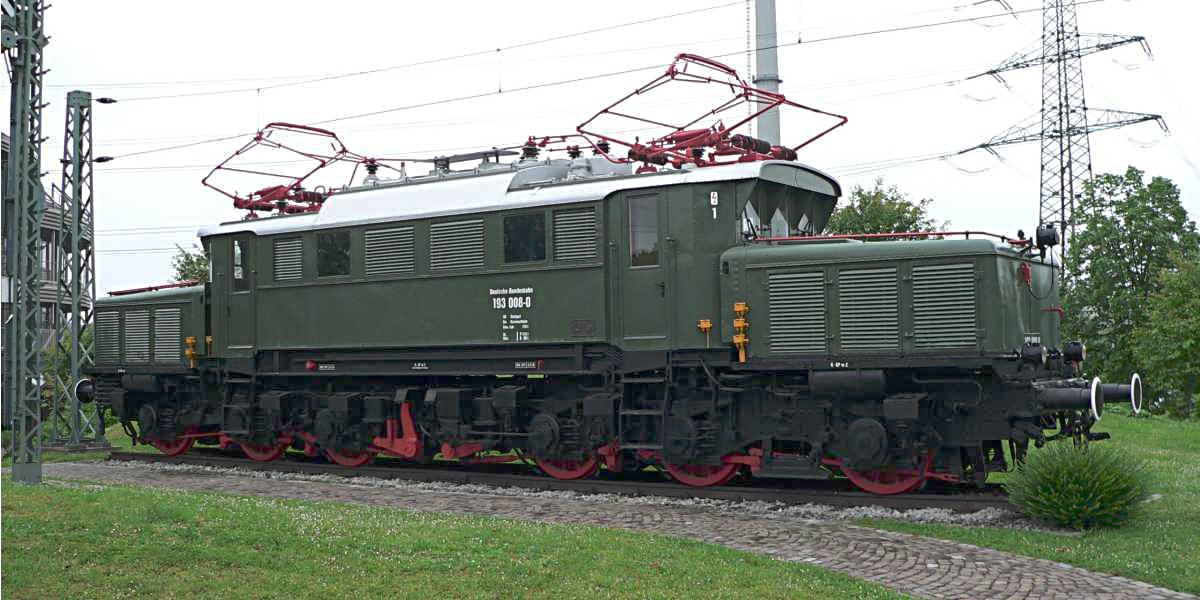
DRG E 93 class 3,355 hp heavy-freight electric loco of 1933

There were initially few electric locomotives with this wheel arrangement, as they are usually lighter than diesel-electrics of similar power and so could manage a similar axle loading with a simpler Bo-Bo arrangement. Some of the few early examples were the French CC 7100 of 1949 and the British Railways EM2 of 1953.

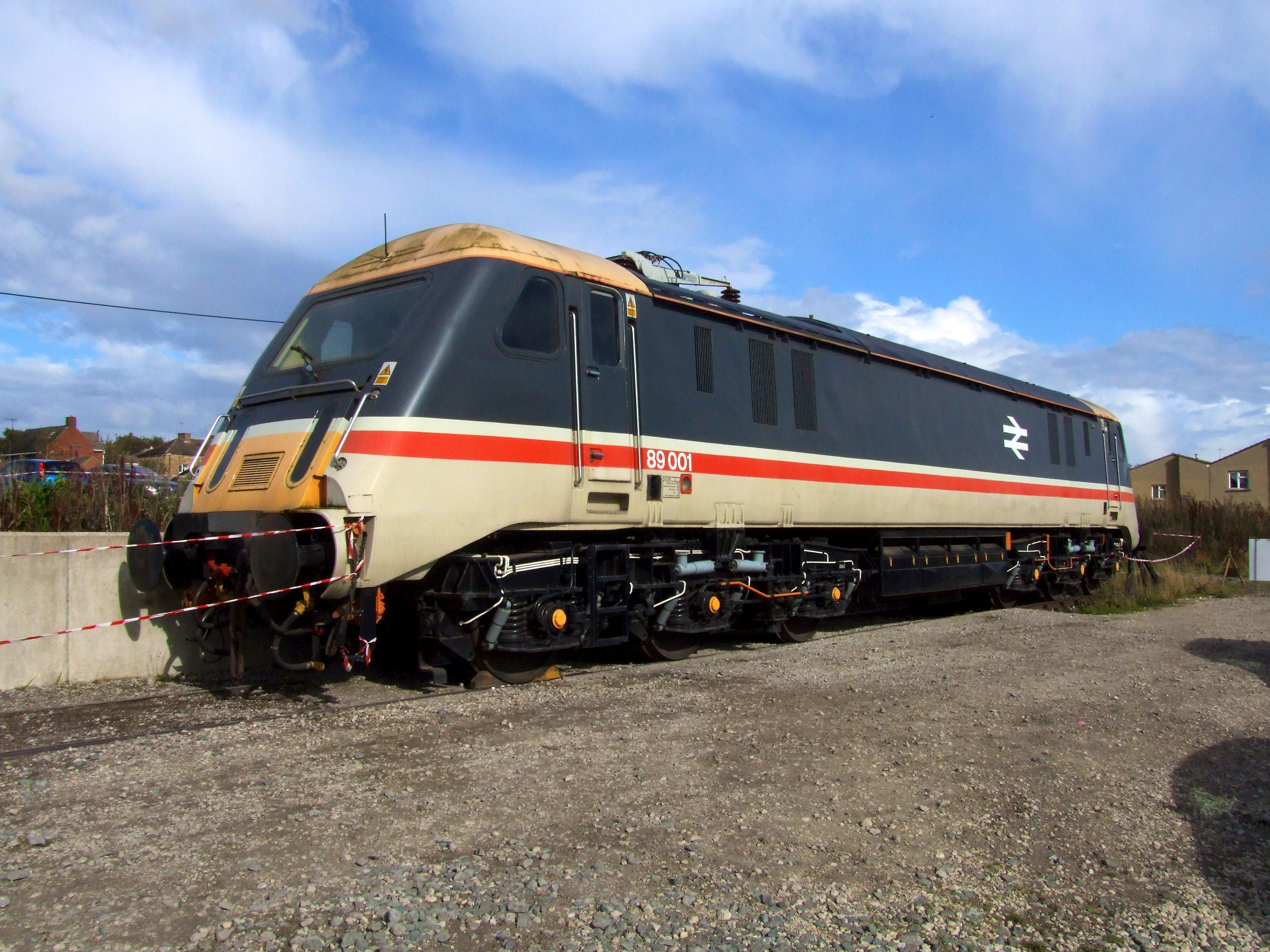
British Rail Class 89 25 kV electric

As high-speed electric locomotives in the 1980s began to achieve powers in the 6,000 hp range, new Co-Co designs appeared, as more axles were needed to distribute this high power. The BR class 92 was a predominantly freight locomotive of this arrangement for the Channel Tunnel, although the passenger Eurotunnel Class 9 instead use a Bo-Bo-Bo arrangement. This provides the same number of axles for traction, although with shorter bogie wheelbases and so gives a smoother ride.

=== C-C ===
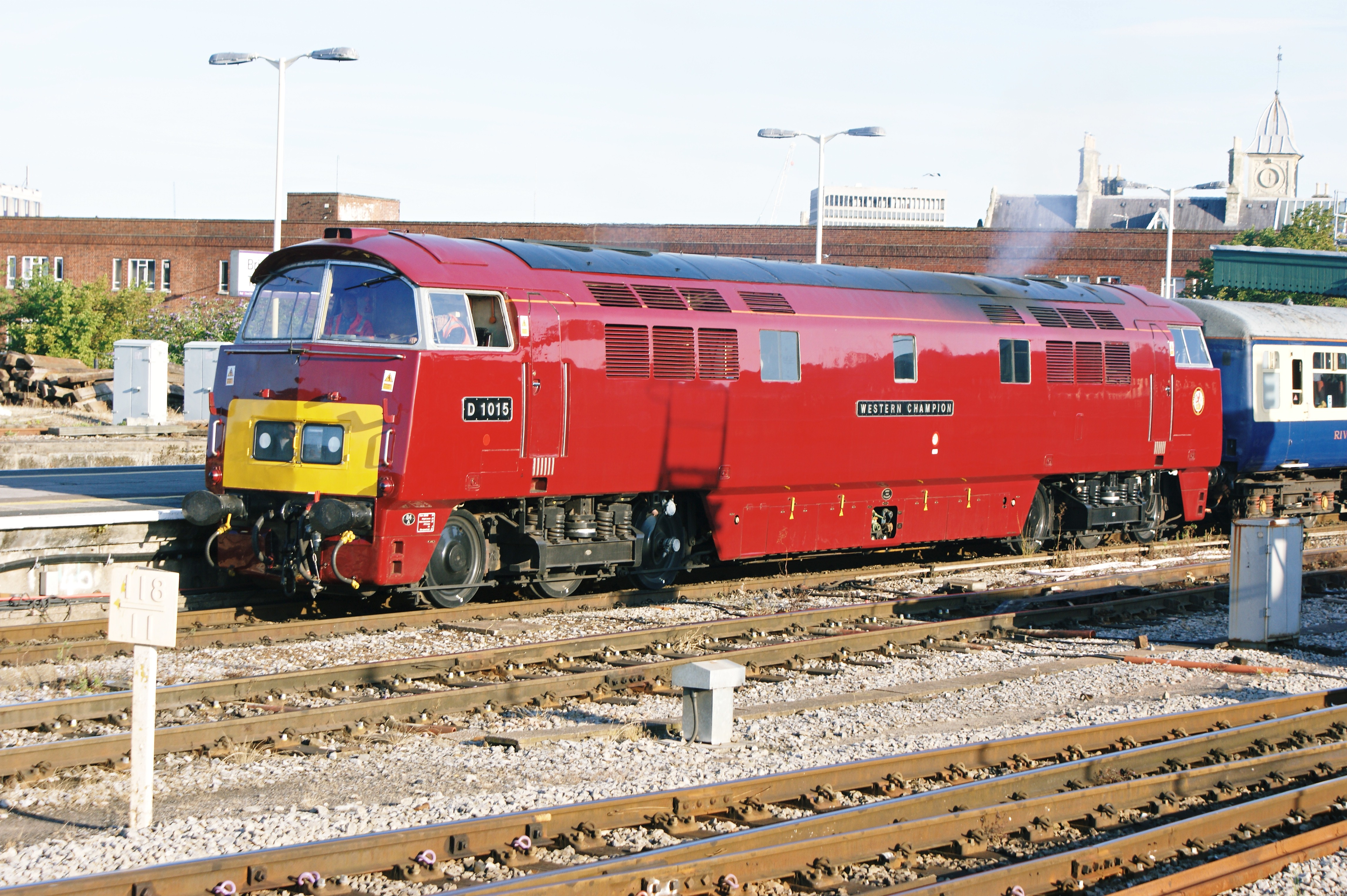
British Railways class 52 Western

In C-C (Commonwealth) or C′C′ (UIC) arrangements, the axles of each bogie are coupled together. This may be for either a diesel-hydraulic transmission with a mechanical drive shaft to the bogie and final drives to each axle. Otherwise a monomotor bogie with a single traction motor. These are used for both electrics and diesel-electrics.

=== Co+Co ===
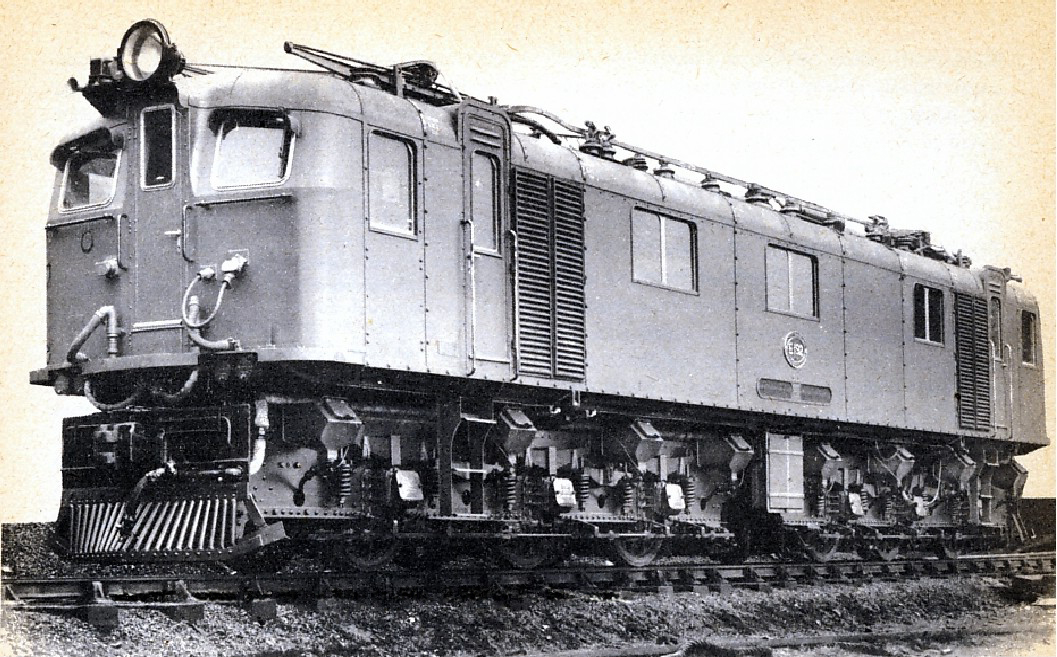
South African class 3E of 1947, showing the Co+Co arrangement of the bogies with the drawgear below the body frame

Co+Co is the code for a similar wheel arrangement but with an articulated connection between the bogies. The buffer and drawbar forces are taken between the bogies rather than through the frame. These were mostly popular in South Africa.

=== 1Co-Co1 ===
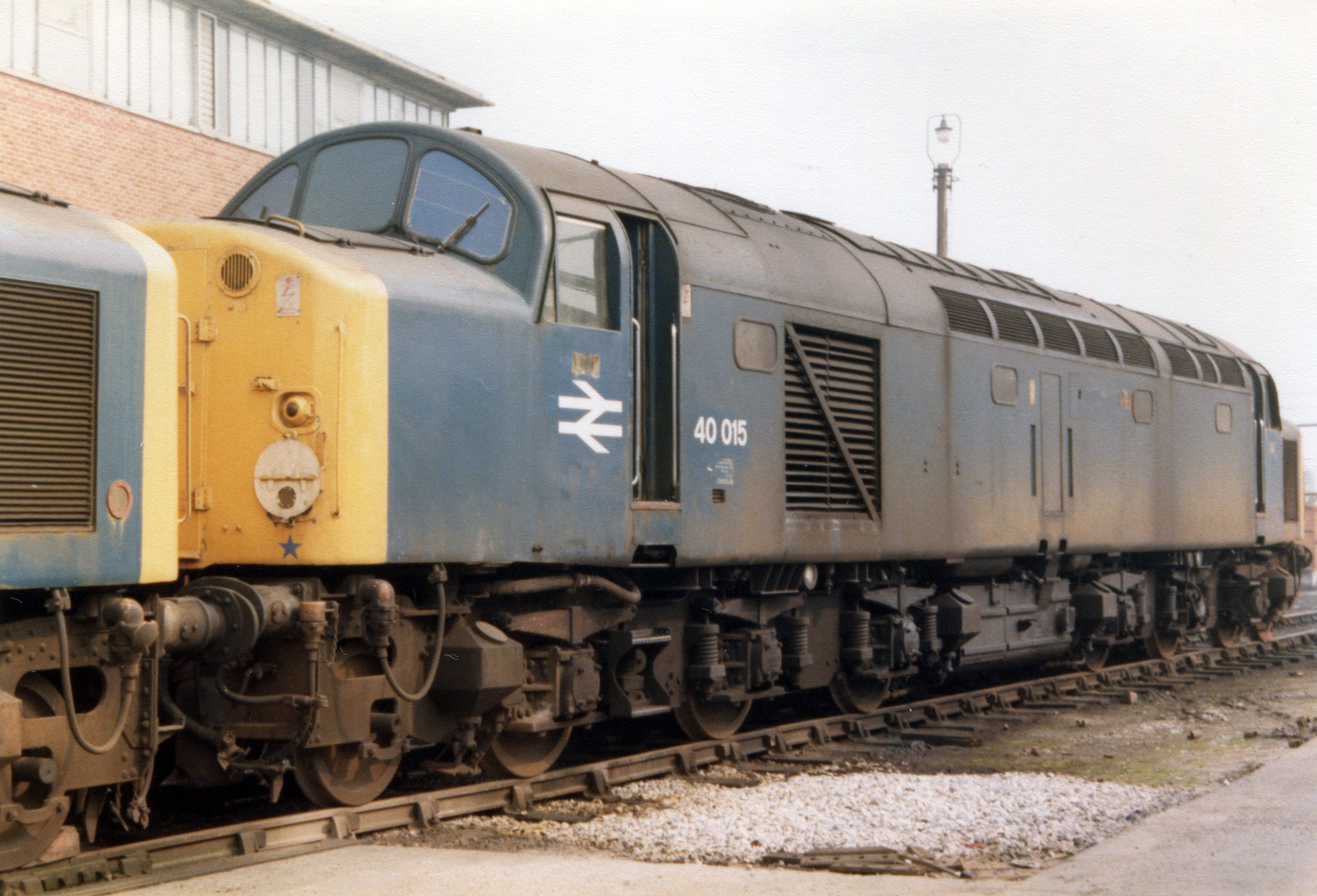
British Rail Class 40 1Co-Co1

The 1Co-Co1 wheel arrangement is an alternative to the Co-Co arrangement which has been used where it was desired to reduce axle load. Each 'Co' bogie has an additional non-powered axle in an integral pony truck to spread the load. As the pony truck is articulated within the bogie, the arrangement is (1′Co)(Co1′) in UIC notation.

This rare arrangement was used primarily in Britain with the development of the Bollen bogie; on the Southern Railways' first three prototype mainline diesel-electric designs, 10201–10203, and then on production vehicles in British Rail's Class 40 and "Peaks" (BR classes 44, 45, and 46).

=== 1Co+Co1 ===
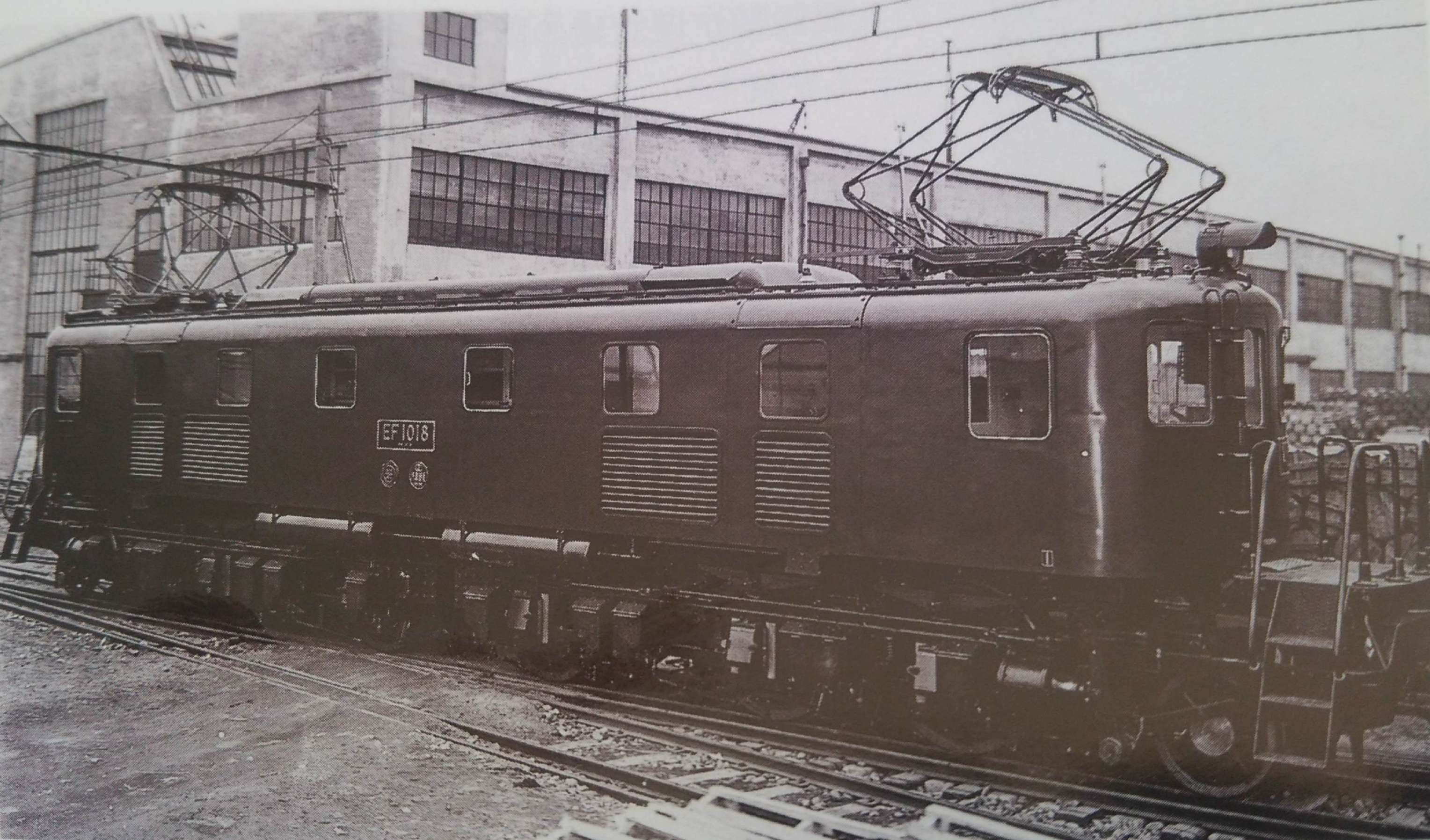
Japanese EF10 in 1938

1Co+Co1, like Co+Co, is an articulated variant where the drawbar forces are taken between the bogies rather than through the frame. These were used in South Africa, for lighter loadings on the lightly laid 3 ft 6 in (1,067 mm) Cape gauge. A number of Japanese electrics from the 1930s, also on Cape gauge, such as the EF10 also used this arrangement.

=== 2Co-Co2 ===
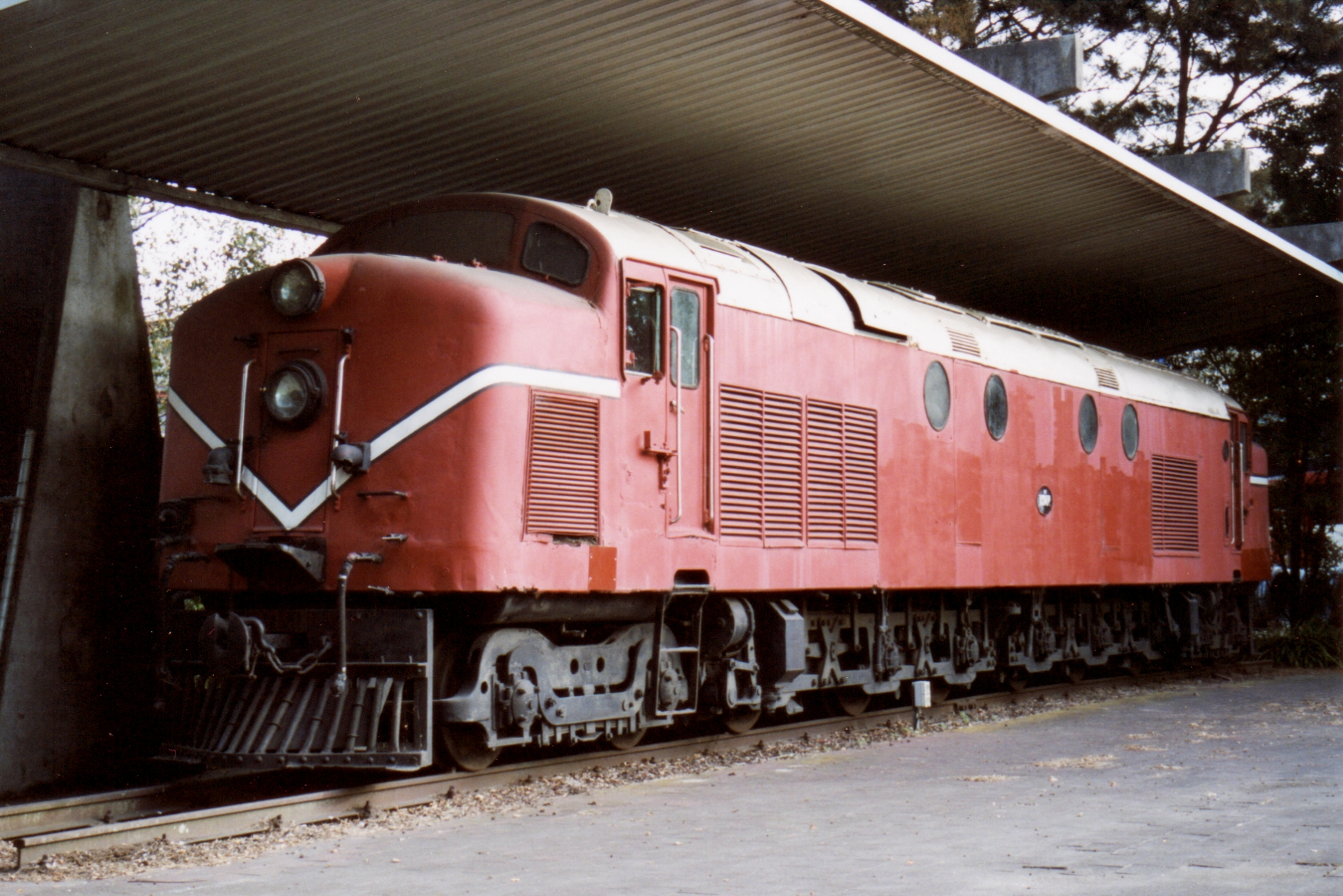
New Zealand D^{F} class

The New Zealand D^{F} class were built in the mid-1950s by English Electric in Britain, as the first diesels for the 3 ft 6 in (1,067 mm) New Zealand railways. They were derived from the earlier English Electric 1Co-Co1 bogie design, but to provide increased flexibility for the long wheelbase bogie they used a four-wheeled bogie with more side play, rather than a pony truck.

== See also ==
- Co-Bo, which has two uncoupled bogies
