= JR Freight Class ED500 =

Japanese electric locomotive

Class ED500
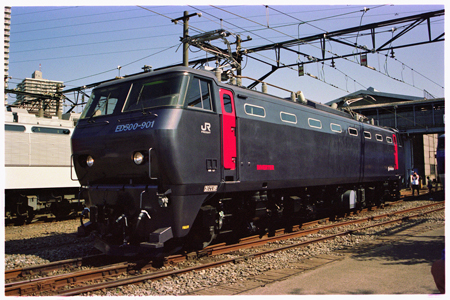
- ED500-901 at Shin-Tsurumi Depot, August 1992
Type and origin
- Power type: Electric
- Builder: Hitachi
- Build date: 1992
- Total produced: 1
Specifications
- Configuration
  - UIC: Bo-Bo
- Gauge: 1,067 mm (3 ft 6 in)
- Wheel diameter: 1,120 mm (44.09 in)
- Length: 17,600 mm (57 ft 8 7/8 in)
- Width: 2,905 mm (9 ft 6 3/8 in)
- Loco weight: 67.2 t (66.1 long tons; 74.1 short tons)
- Electric system/s: 20 kV AC at 50/60 Hz overhead wire
- Current pickup: pantograph
- Traction motors: AC
Performance figures
- Maximum speed: 120 km/h (75 mph)
- Power output: 4 MW (5,400 hp)
- Tractive effort: 28,367 kgf (62,540 lbf)
Career
- Operators: JR Freight
- Numbers: ED500-901
- Preserved: 0
- Disposition: Withdrawn and cut up

The Class ED500 was a single Bo-Bo wheel arrangement dual voltage AC/DC electric locomotive built experimentally by Hitachi in Japan in 1992. The design was derived from the DC Bo-Bo-Bo wheel arrangement Class EF200 also built by Hitachi, and was intended to replace Class ED75 locomotives on Tohoku Main Line freight services. The locomotive was loaned to JR Freight for testing until 1994, but the design was not selected for full production due to problems with restarting a single Bo-Bo wheel arrangement locomotive on the 25‰, 2.5%, gradients of the Tohoku Main Line and in the Seikan Tunnel. The Class EH500 articulated Bo-Bo+Bo-Bo design was ultimately chosen instead.

== External appearance ==
Visually resembling the EF200 locomotives, the ED500 was finished in all-over black with red cab doors.

== Classification ==
The ED500 classification for this locomotive type is explained below. As with previous locomotive designs, the prototype was numbered ED500-901.

- E: Electric locomotive
- D: Four driving axles
- 500: AC/DC locomotive with AC motors
