= 9000 class =

9000 class or Class 9000 may refer to:

- Eurotunnel Class 9000, electric locomotives
- PNR 9000 Class, diesel-hydraulic locomotives
- Union Pacific 9000 Class, 4-12-2 steam locomotives
