= JR Freight Class EF200 =

Japanese electric locomotive class

Class EF200
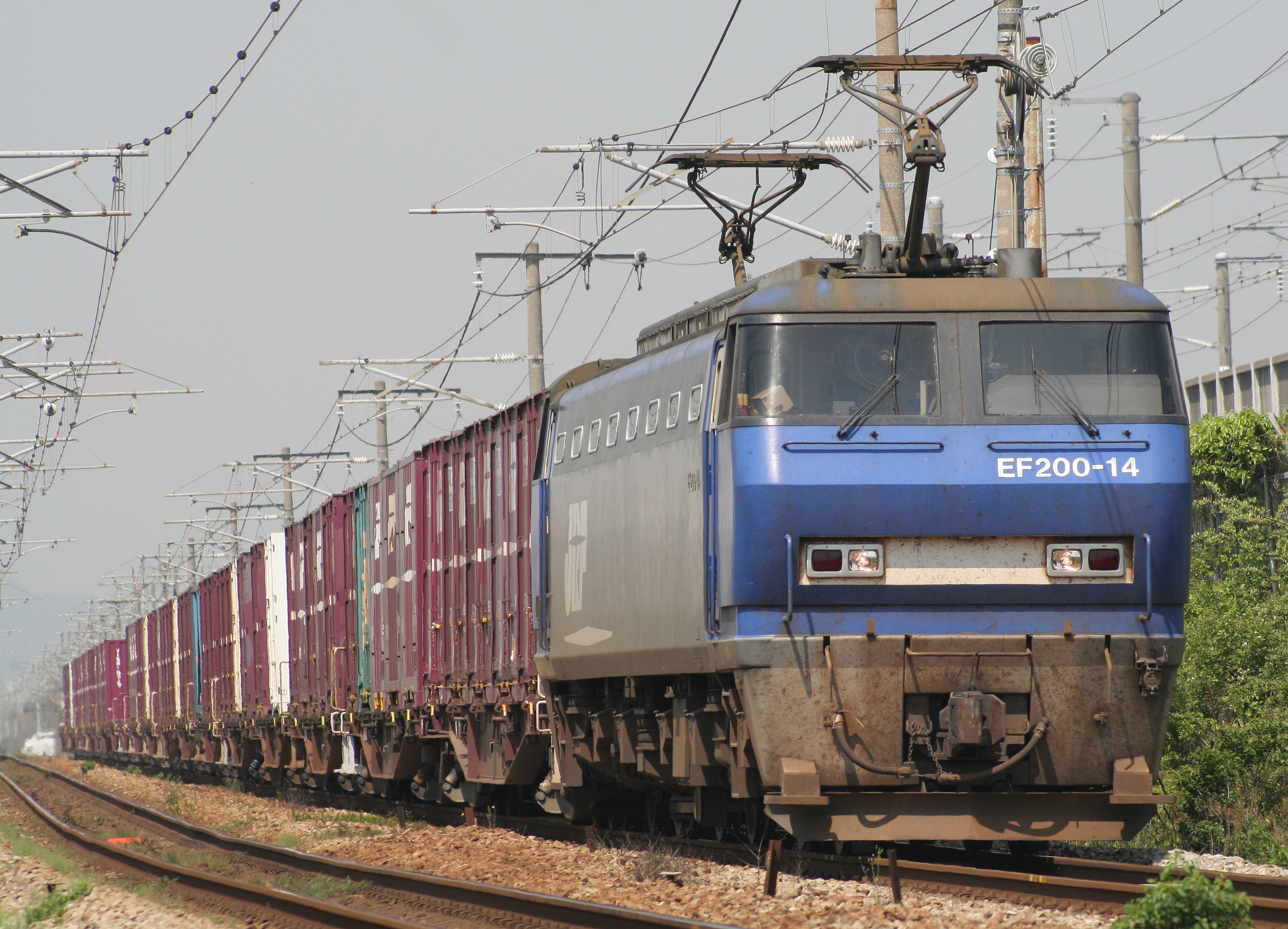
- EF200-14 in revised livery in May 2009
Type and origin
- Power type: Electric
- Builder: Hitachi Rail
- Build date: 1990–1993
- Total produced: 21
Specifications
- Configuration
  - UIC: Bo′Bo′Bo′
- Gauge: 1,067 mm (3 ft 6 in)
- Bogies: FD3 (outer), FD4A (centre)
- Wheel diameter: 1,120 mm (44.09 in)
- Length: 19,400 mm (63 ft 7 3/4 in)
- Width: 2,970 mm (9 ft 8 7/8 in)
- Loco weight: 100.8 t (99.2 long tons; 111.1 short tons)
- Electric system/s: 1,500 V DC overhead wire
- Current pickup: FPS2A pantograph x2
- Traction motors: AC
- Safety systems: ATS-PF, ATS-SF
Performance figures
- Maximum speed: 110 km/h (70 mph)
- Power output: 6 MW (8,000 hp)
- Tractive effort: 26,600 kgf (261,000 N; 59,000 lbf)
Career
- Operators: JR Freight
- Number in class: 12 (as of 1 April 2016)
- First run: 1990
- Withdrawn: 28 March 2019
- Preserved: 1
- Disposition: Retired

The Class EF200 (EF200形) was a Bo-Bo-Bo wheel arrangement DC electric locomotive type operated by JR Freight on freight services in Japan from 1992 until its retirement on 28 March 2019.

== Overview ==
The Class EF200 was developed to replace Class EF66 electric locomotives on heavy freight services on the Tokaido Main Line and Sanyo Main Line west of Tokyo. It is equipped with six 1,000 kW (1,300 hp) FMT2 traction motors, giving a total power output of 6,000 kW (8,000 hp). Ultimately, the class was deemed to be over-specified and unnecessarily expensive, and the order was terminated after the delivery of 20 full-production locomotives. The subsequent Class EF210 was instead chosen as the standard design for hauling freight services on the Tokaido Main Line and Sanyo Main Line. Originally designed to haul 1,600-tonne (1,575-long-ton; 1,764-short-ton) freight trains, problems of insufficient power supply capacity to the overhead lines, meant that the class was initially limited to hauling 1,200-tonne (1,181-long-ton; 1,323-short-ton) trains.

== Operations ==
As of 1 April 2016, the fleet consists of 12 locomotives (EF200-2 – 7, 10, 15, and 17 – 20), based at Suita Depot in Osaka. They are used primarily on 1,300 t freight trains west of Tokyo on the Tokaido and Sanyo Main Lines.

== Variants ==
- EF200-900: Prototype locomotive EF200-901, built 1990
- EF200-0: Full-production locomotives EF200-1 – 20, built 1992–1993

== History ==
The prototype locomotive, EF200-901, was delivered in March 1990 for extensive testing. The first full-production locomotives were delivered to Shin-Tsurumi Depot in Tokyo in 1992, entering revenue service on the Tokaido Main Line and Sanyo Main Line from the summer of that year. In 1992, the Class EF200 was awarded the Laurel Prize, presented annually by the Japan Railfan Club.

From 1 April 1999, the entire class was transferred from Shin-Tsurumi in Tokyo to Suita Depot in Osaka. Between 2006 and 2009, the entire fleet was repainted into a new livery similar to that used for the later Class EF210 locomotives. EF200-901 was similarly repainted in 2007.

From 2007, the class was power-derated to match the power output of the older Class EF66 locomotives. In 2011, one class member, EF200-1, was withdrawn.

During fiscal 2015, eight members of the class were removed from regular duties, leaving 12 members in service. The final service of the Class EF200 took place on 28 March 2019, as EF200-18 hauled its last freight train from the Hatabu yard in Shimonoseki to the Suita freight terminal in Osaka.

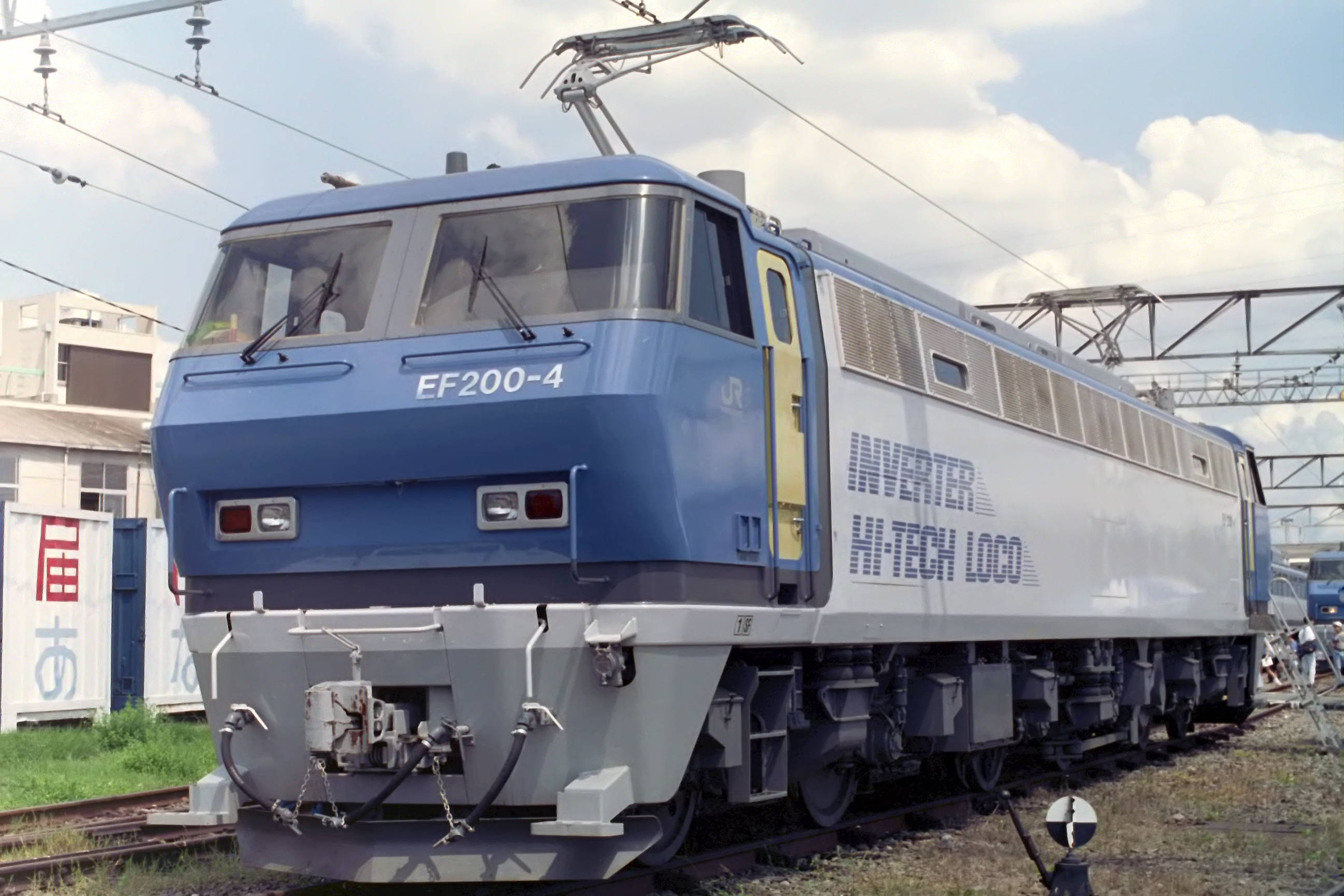
EF200-4 in original livery in August 1992

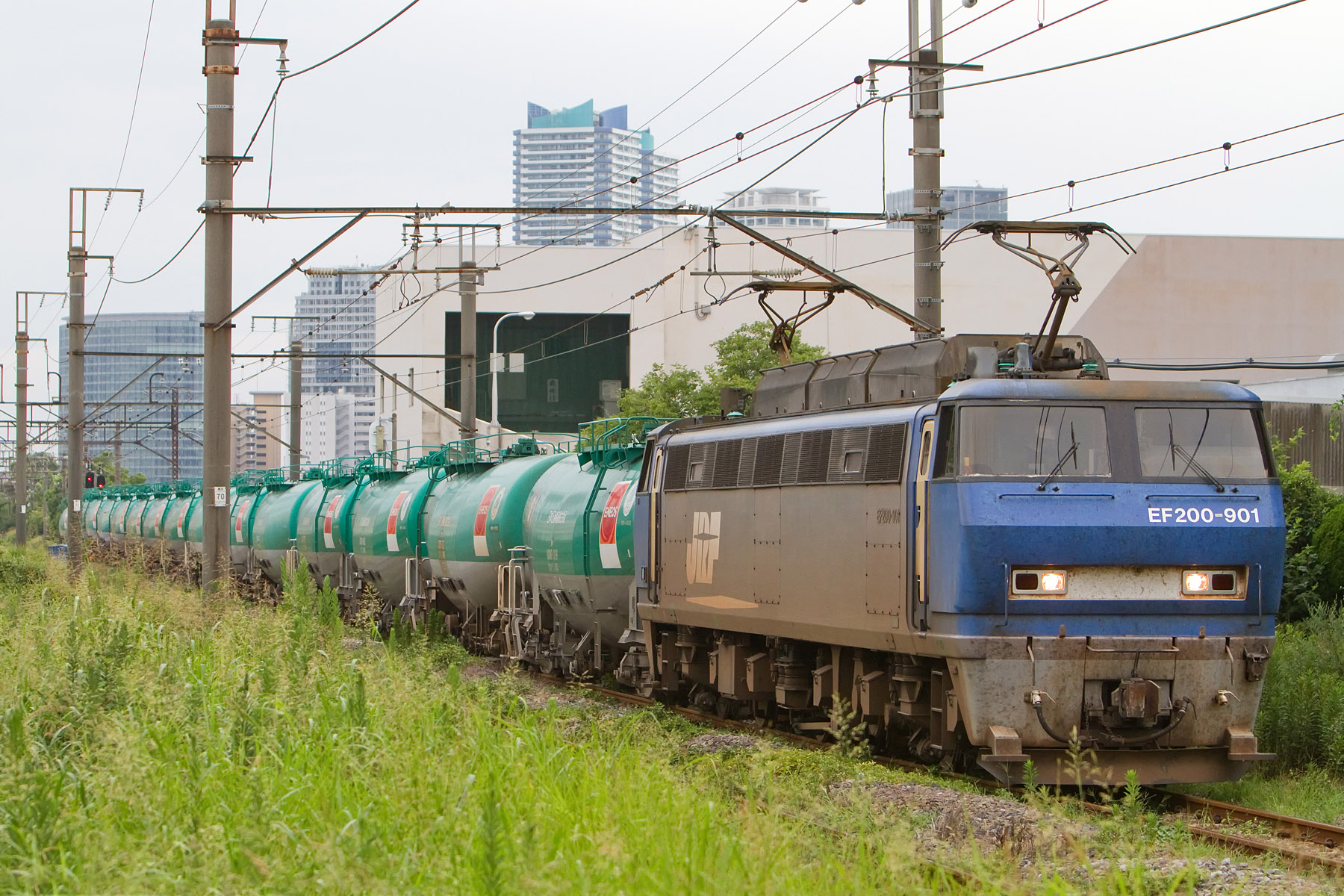
Prototype locomotive EF200-901 in revised livery in August 2013

== Preserved examples ==
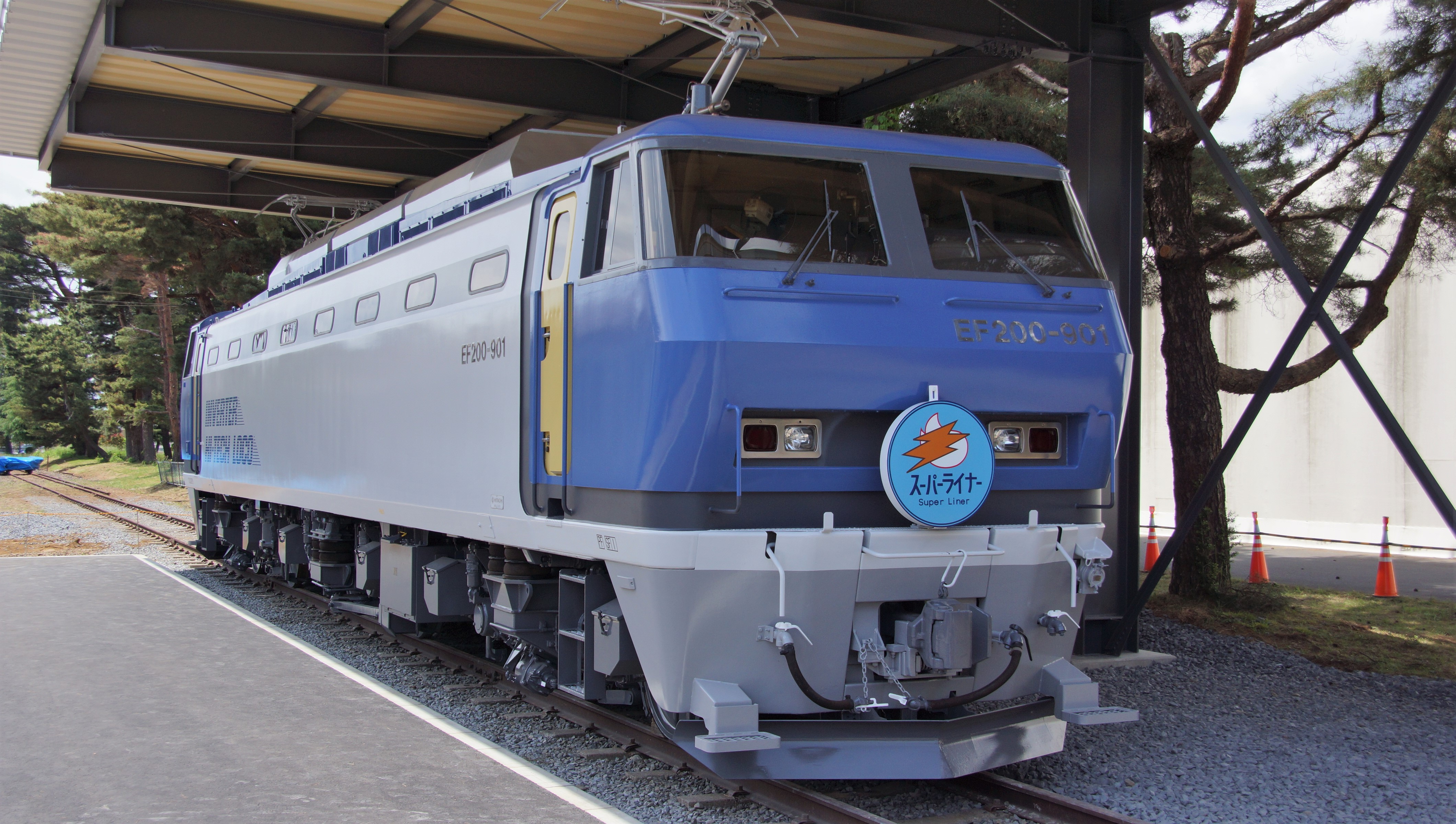
Preserved EF200-901 at the Hitachi Mito factory in May 2017

The prototype locomotive, EF200-901, was withdrawn in March 2016 and moved to the Hitachi Mito factory in Hitachinaka, Ibaraki, in October 2016, where it was restored to its original livery.

== Classification ==
The EF200 classification for this locomotive type is explained below. As with previous locomotive designs, the prototype was numbered EF200-901, with subsequent production locomotives numbered from EF200-1 onward.

- E: Electric locomotive
- F: Six driving axles
- 200: DC locomotive with AC motors
