= Indian locomotive class WAG-6A =

Indian locomotive class WAG–6A
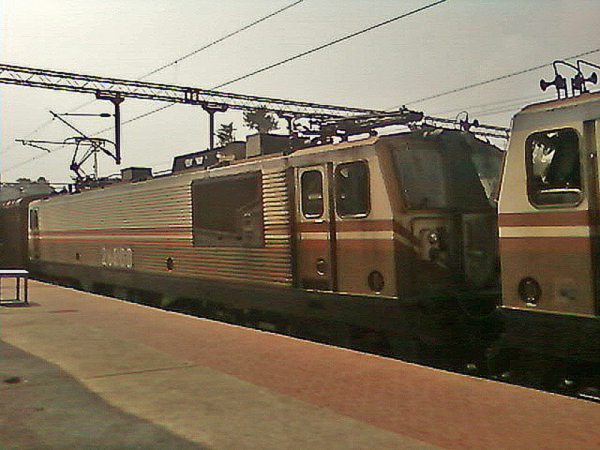
- Twin WAG-6A locomotives with a BCNA freight train
Type and origin
- Power type: Electric
- Designer: ASEA, Brown, Boveri & Cie
- Builder: ASEA, Brown, Boveri & Cie
- Order number: 85/RSF/459/2/(LT-33)
- Build date: 1988–1989
- Total produced: 6
Specifications
- Configuration
  - UIC: Bo'Bo'Bo'
  - Commonwealth: Bo-Bo-Bo
- Gauge: 5 ft 6 in (1,676 mm)
- Bogies: 2 axle double stage field excitation
- Wheel diameter: New: 1,029 mm (3 ft 5 in); Half-worn: 1,052 mm (3 ft 5 1/2 in); Fully worn: 1,012 mm (3 ft 4 in)
- Wheelbase: 2,700 mm (8 ft 10 in)
- Length
  - Over beams: 20,600 mm (67 ft 7 in)
  - Over body: 19,300 mm (63 ft 4 in)
- Width: 3,184 mm (10 ft 5 1/4 in)
- Height: 4,170 mm (13 ft 8 in)
- Frame type: 2 axle double stage field excitation
- Axle load: 20.5 tonnes (20.2 long tons; 22.6 short tons) ±2%
- Loco weight: 123 tonnes (121 long tons; 136 short tons) ±1%
- Power supply: 110 V DC
- Electric system/s: 25 kV AC Overhead
- Current pickup(s): pantograph
- Traction motors: ASEA L3 M 450-2
- MU working: 2 units
- Loco brake: Air, Dynamic braking
- Train brakes: Air
- Safety systems: Slip control, Over voltage relay, No volt relay, Earth fault relay, Low pressure governor, Train parting alarms, and Brake cylinder cutoff valve
Performance figures
- Maximum speed: 120.7 km/h (75 mph); upgradable to 160 km/h (99 mph)
- Power output
  - Starting: Max: 6,200 hp (4,620 kW)
  - 1 hour: Max: 6,110 hp (4,560 kW)
  - Continuous: Max: 6,000 hp (4,470 kW)
- Tractive effort
  - Starting: 32,000 kgf (310 kN)
  - 1 hour: 32,000 kgf (310 kN)
  - Continuous: 28,200 kgf (280 kN)
- Factor of adh.: 0.25
Career
- Operators: Indian Railways
- Numbers: 26000-26005
- Locale: Kothavalasa–Kirandul line
- Delivered: December 1987 (First unit); January 1988 (remaining 5)
- First run: 1988
- Last run: 7 June 2015
- Retired: 7 August 2015
- Withdrawn: 7 August 2015
- Preserved: 1 earmarked
- Scrapped: From 2007 to 2015
- Current owner: Indian Railways
- Disposition: Withdrawn, and all except 1 locomotive scrapped

The Indian locomotive class WAG-6A is a class of 25 kV AC electric locomotives that was developed in the 1988 by Allmänna Svenska Elektriska Aktiebolaget (ASEA) for Indian Railways. The model name stands for broad gauge (W), AC Current (A), Goods (G) engine, 6th generation (6) First variant (A). They entered service in 1988. A total of six WAG-6A were built at ASEA, Sweden between 1987 and 1988. they were the most powerful locomotives in India until the arrival of the WAG-9 class.

All locomotives of this class have been withdrawn from service, with one unit earmarked for preservation.

== History ==
The history of WAG-6A begins in early 1980s with the aim of addressing the shortcomings of the previous WAG-1, WAG-2, WAG-3, WAG-4 and WAG-5 classes and remove steam locomotives from IR by a target date of 1990. The WAG-5 were a great successes but these locomotives were based on 1960s technology and fast became underpowered for the expanding Indian railways. So Indian Railways decided to look for a new locomotive. At that time during the 1980s, Thyristor controller was vastly used by locomotive in many European rail networks while 3 Phase AC technology was still in its infancy. So the Ministry of Railways floated a tender for a 6000 horsepower locomotive with Thyristor control. The following responses were received:

- ASEA submitted their model with 6000 hp with Bo-Bo-Bo bogies and Thyristor chopper control.
- Hitachi submitted their model with 6000 hp with Bo-Bo-Bo bogies and Thyristor chopper control
- Hitachi also submitted their model with 6000 hp with Co-Co- bogies and Thyristor chopper control

Each company submitted their prototypes and Indian Railways designated these prototypes as the WAG-6A class WAG-6B class and WAG-6C class respectively. IR ordered 6 of each class and these were delivered in 1988.

== Specification ==
- Manufacturer: ASEA ( WAG 6A )
- Build dates: 1988–89
- Wheel arrangement: Bo-Bo-Bo
- Traction Motors: ASEA make (WAG-6A), L3 M 450–2. Six motors, fully suspended, force-ventilated, separately excited, 3100 kg.
- Transformer: (WAG-6A) ASEA: TMZ 21, 7533 kVA.
- Thyristor controller: (WAG-6A) 24 YST 45-26P24C thyristors each with 24 YSD35-OIP26 diodes, 2 x 511 V, 2 x 4500 A.
- Pantographs: (WAG-6A) Two Stemman BS 95.

== Locomotive shed ==
- All locomotives of this class have been withdrawn from service.

== See also ==
- Indian Railways
- Rail transport in India#History
- Locomotives of India
- Rail transport in India
