= JNR Class EF10 =

Japanese electric locomotive class

Class EF10
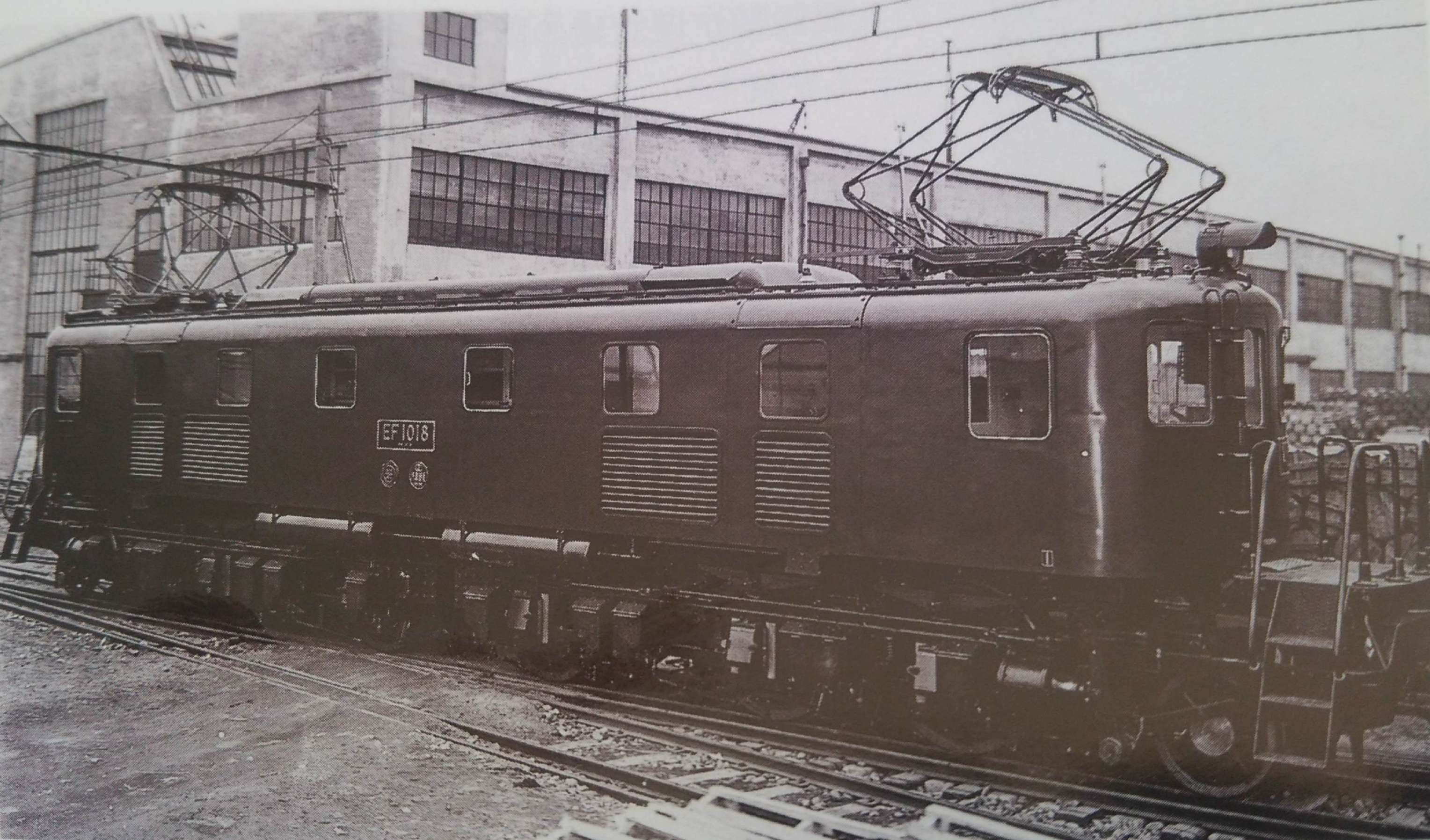
- EF10 18 shortly after completion in 1938
Type and origin
- Power type: Electric
- Builder: Hitachi, Kawasaki Heavy Industries, Kisha Seizo, Mitsubishi, Toshiba
- Build date: 1934–1941
- Total produced: 41
Specifications
- Configuration
  - UIC: (1′Co)+(Co1′)
- Gauge: 1,067 mm (3 ft 6 in)
- Bogies: HT56
- Wheel diameter: 1,250 mm (49.21 in)
- Trailing dia.: 860 mm (33.86 in)
- Length
  - Over couplers: 18,380 mm (60 ft 3 5/8 in)
- Width: 2,810 mm (9 ft 2 5/8 in)
- Height: 3,940 mm (12 ft 11 1/8 in)
- Loco weight: 97.5 t (96.0 long tons; 107.5 short tons)
- Electric system/s: 1,500 V DC overhead line
- Current pickup(s): Pantograph
- Transmission: 1 stage gear reduction, suspended type
Performance figures
- Maximum speed: 75 km/h (45 mph)
- Power output: 1,350 kW (1,810 hp)
- Tractive effort: 11,700 kgf (26,000 lbf)
Career
- Operators: JNR
- Number in class: 41
- Numbers: EF10 1 - 41
- First run: 1934
- Preserved: 1
- Disposition: All withdrawn

The Class EF10 (EF10形) is an electric locomotive built for the Japanese Government Railways formerly operated on freight services in Japan from 1934 until 1983.

== History ==
41 locomotives were built between 1934 and 1941 by the manufacturers Hitachi, Kawasaki Heavy Industries, Kisha Seizo, Mitsubishi, and Toshiba.

Locomotive construction was divided into four batches, with further differences within individual batches as follows.

=== EF10 1 - 16 ===
Locomotives EF10 1 to 16 had bodies with similar styling to the Class ED16 and Class EF53 locomotives.

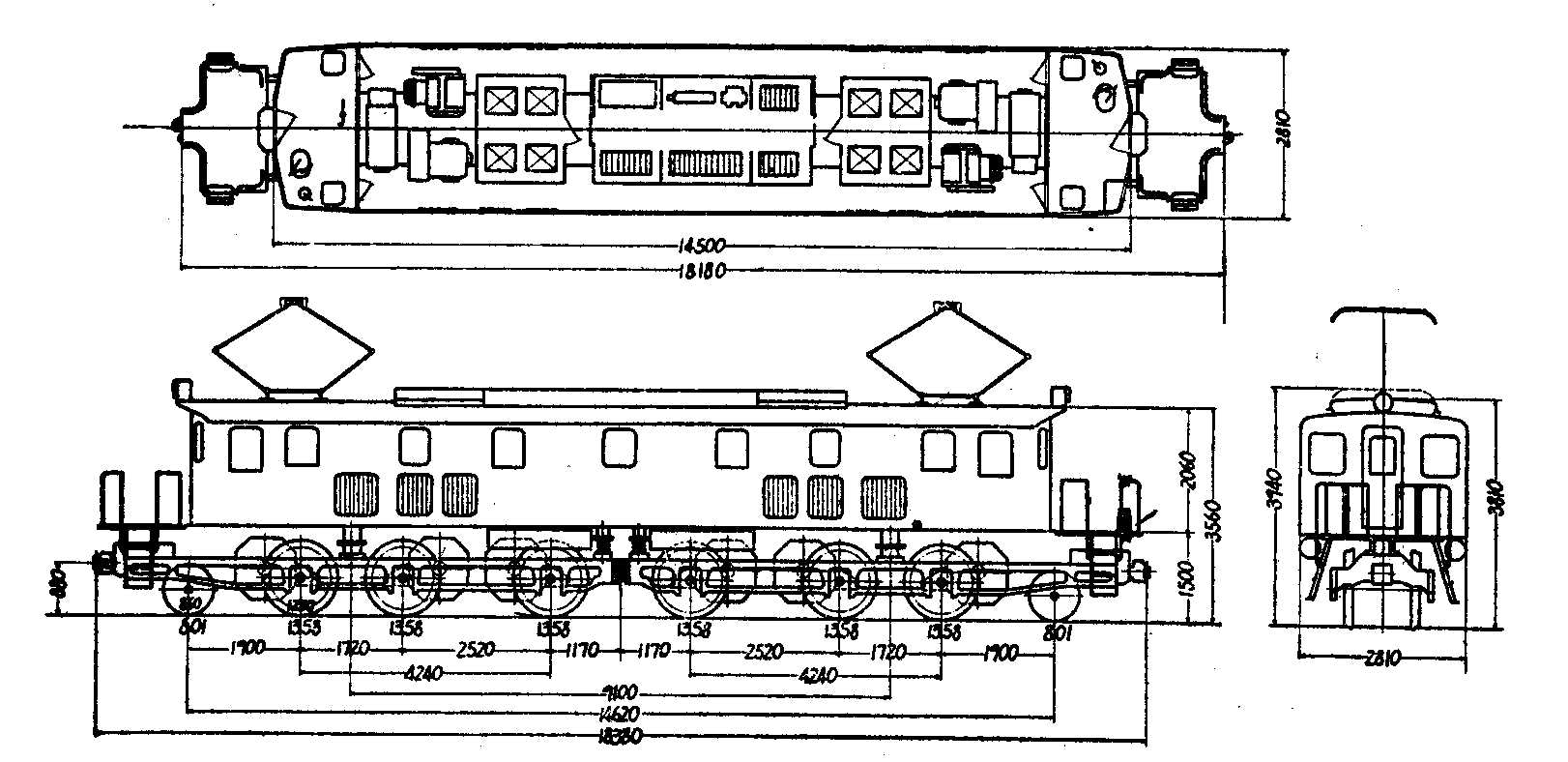
EF10 1-16

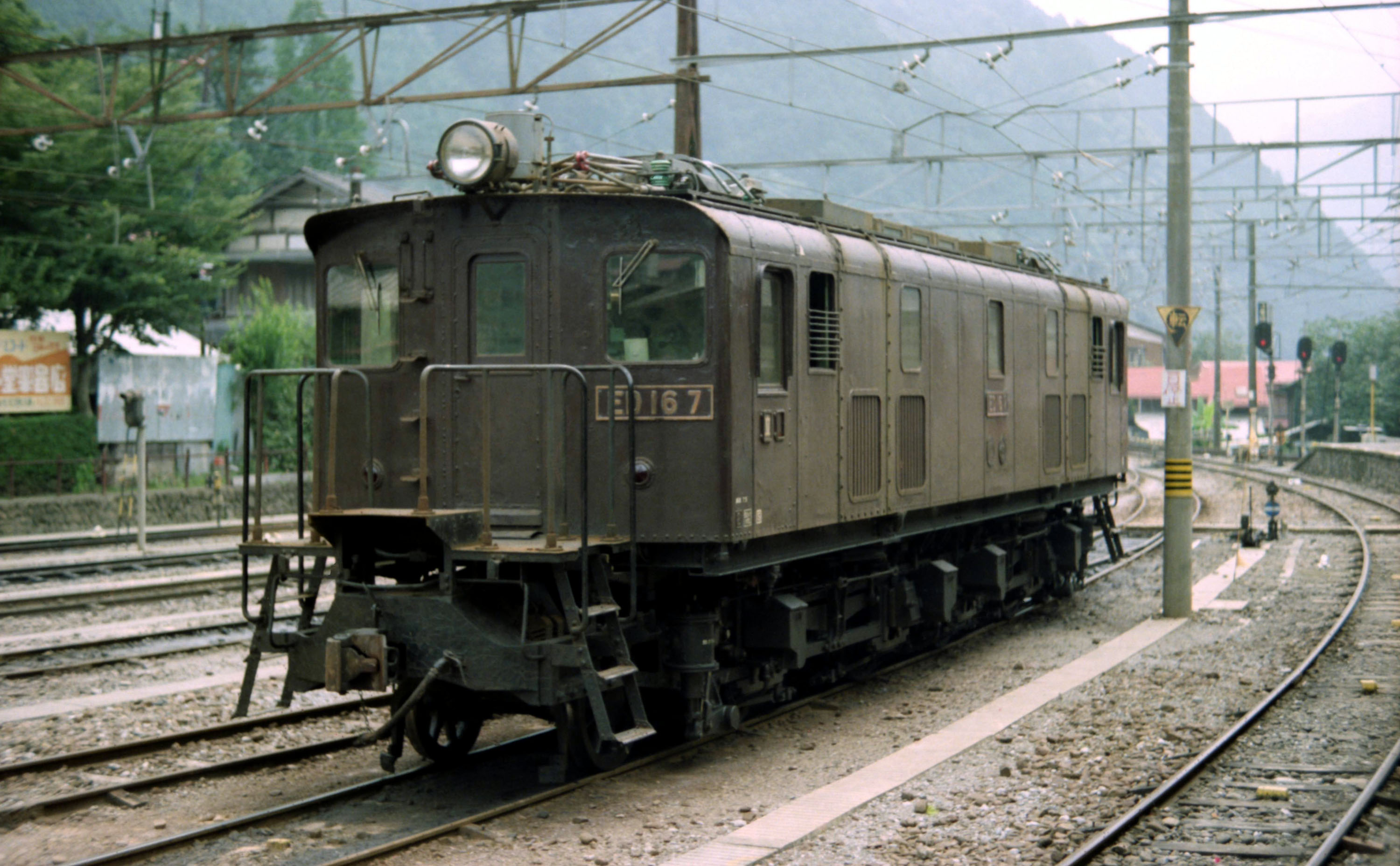
A Class ED16 locomotive for comparison

=== EF10 17 ===
EF10 17 was built in 1937 with a welded body and more rounded styling.

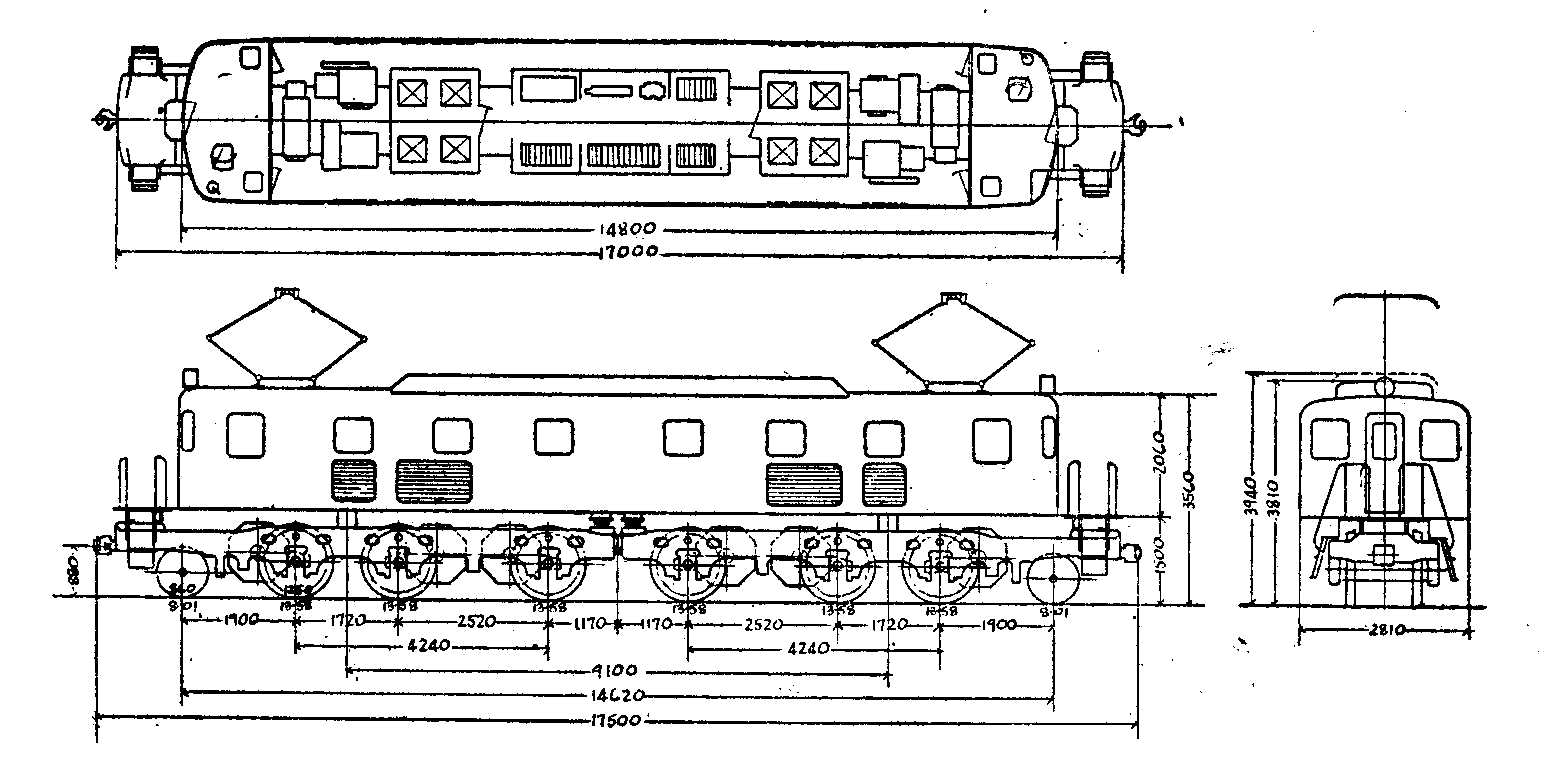
EF10 17

=== EF10 18 - 19 ===
Locomotives EF10 18 and 19 continued with the same rounded body styling as EF10 17, but used a similar bar frame bogie design to the first batch of locomotives.

=== EF10 20 - 24 ===
Locomotives EF10 20 to 24 continued with the same body design, but with a different ventilator arrangement.

=== EF10 25 - 29 ===
Locomotives EF10 25 to 29 had welded bodies, but reverted to a more angular design.

=== EF10 30 - 33 ===
Locomotives EF10 30 to 33 continued with the same welded angular body design, but used cast bogie frames.

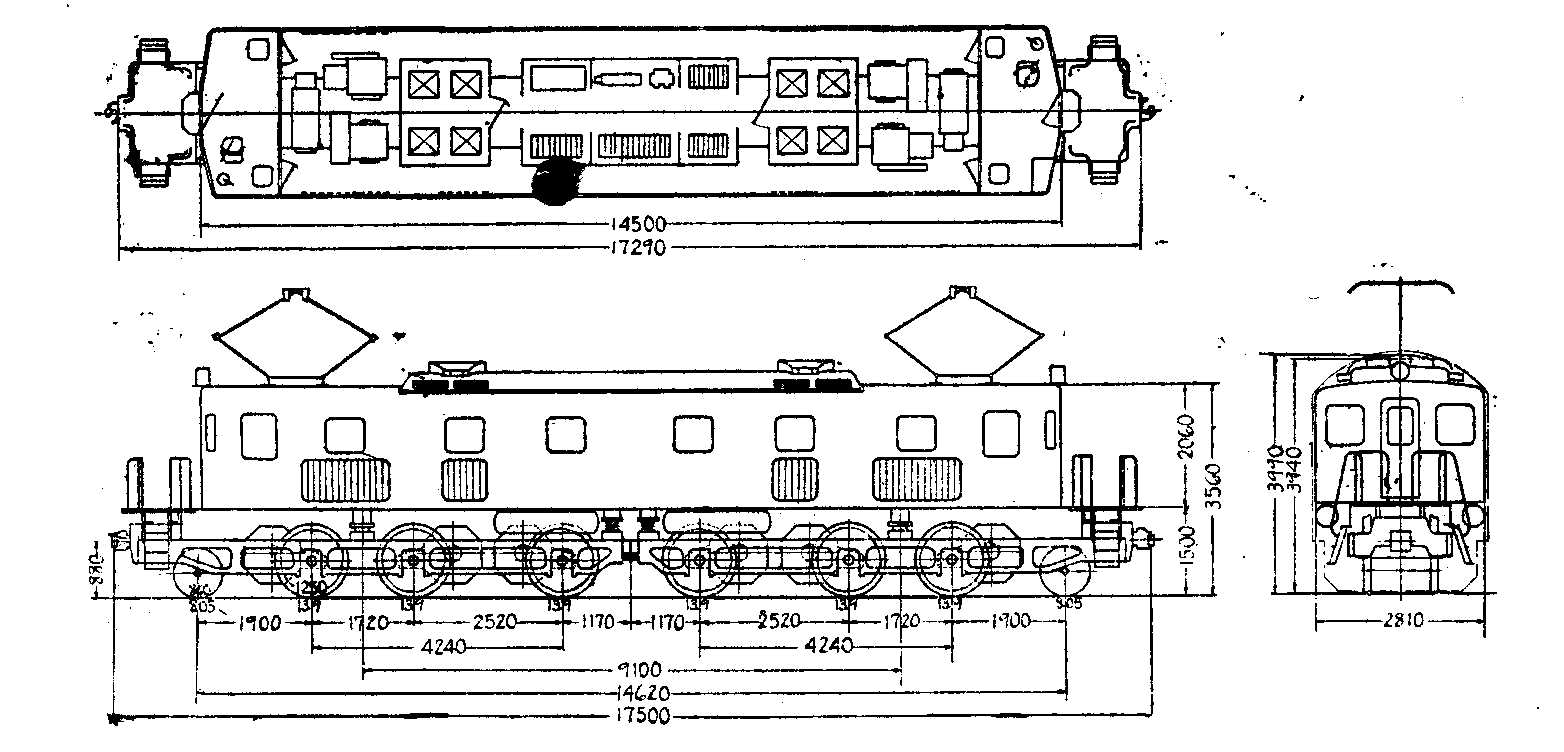
EF10 30-33

=== EF10 34 - 41 ===
Locomotives EF10 34 to 41 used the original bar frame bogie design.

== Preservation ==
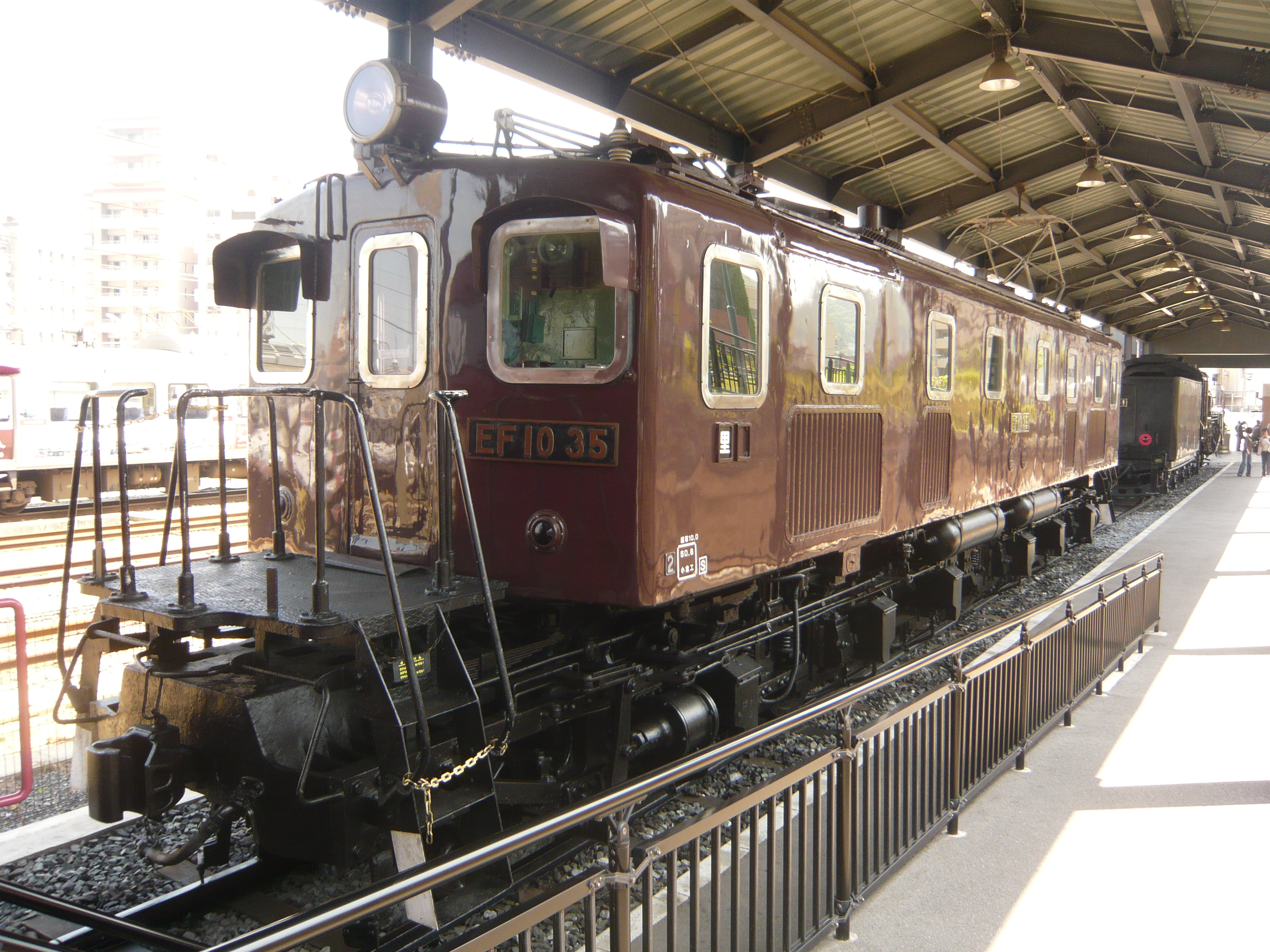
EF10 35 preserved at the Kyushu Railway Museum in January 2007

EF10 35 was preserved in a park in Moji-ku, Kitakyushu before being restored and moved to the newly opened Kyushu Railway History Museum in 2003, where it is preserved statically.

== Classification ==
The EF10 classification for this locomotive type is explained below.

- E: Electric locomotive
- F: Six driving axles
- 10: Locomotive with maximum speed 85 km/h or less

== See also ==
- Railway electrification in Japan
