= Eurotunnel Class 9 =

Electric locomotives for Channel Tunnel trains

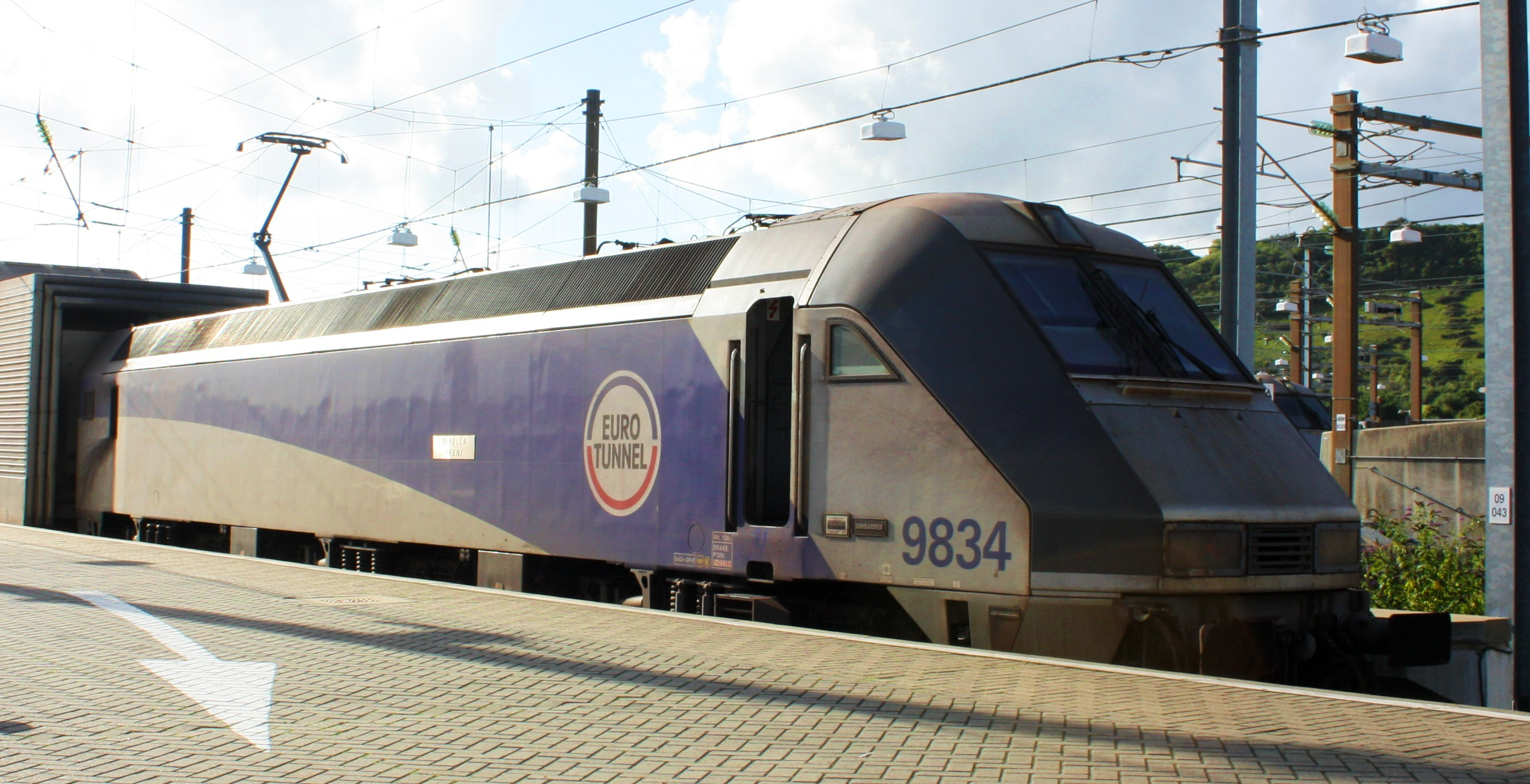
- Locomotive 9834 in 2010
Type and origin
- Power type: Electric
- Builder: Euroshuttle Locomotive Consortium (ABB and Brush Traction)
- Build date: 1993–2002
- Total produced: 58
- Rebuilder: Brush Traction / Bombardier Transportation
Specifications
- Configuration
  - UIC: Bo′Bo′Bo′
- Gauge: 1,435 mm (4 ft 8 1/2 in) standard gauge
- Wheel diameter: 1,250 mm (49.2 in)
- Length: 22 m (72 ft 2 in)
- Width: 2.97 m (9 ft 9 in)
- Height
  - Pantograph: 4.19 m (13 ft 9 in)
- Loco weight: 132 tonnes (130 long tons; 146 short tons)
- Electric system/s: Overhead line, 25 kV 50 Hz AC
- Current pickup: Pantograph (Brecknell Willis)
- Loco brake: Electro-pneumatic air, regenerative brake
- Train brakes: Air
- Safety systems: TVM 430
Performance figures
- Maximum speed: 160 km/h (99 mph)
- Power output: 5.6 or 7 MW (7,500 or 9,400 hp)
- Tractive effort: Max. 400 kN (90,000 lbf); Continuous 310 kN (70,000 lbf) @ 65 km/h (40 mph)
Career
- Operators: Getlink

The Eurotunnel Class 9 or Class 9000 are six-axle high-power Bo′Bo′Bo′ single-ended electric locomotives built by the Euroshuttle Locomotive Consortium (ESCL) of Brush Traction and ABB. The class was designed for and is used exclusively to haul the LeShuttle road vehicle services through the Channel Tunnel.

== Background and design ==
Tendering for the locomotive procurement began in 1989. The specification included; a top speed of 160 km/h (100 mph); a terminal-to-terminal travel time of 33 minutes pulling a 2,100-tonne (2,067-long-ton; 2,315-short-ton) train; an axle load limit of 22.5 tonnes (22.1 long tons; 24.8 short tons); an operating temperature range between −10 °C (14 °F) and 45 °C (113 °F); a loading gauge within the UIC 505-1 standard; a minimum curve radius of 100 m (5 chains); be able to start a shuttle train on a 1 in 160 (0.625 %) gradient with one locomotive bogie inoperative (at 0.13 m/s^{2} (0.43 ft/s^{2})), and a single locomotive should be able to start the train on the same gradient if the other locomotive failed. The operating concession agreement between the tunnel operator and the British and French governments required that there be a locomotive on either end of the train, allowing the reversing or splitting of the train in an emergency.

The design specifications implied a minimum power of 5.6 MW (7,500 hp), and also meant that a four-axle design would not be guaranteed to be able to supply sufficient tractive effort. ESCL proposed a six-axle Bo′Bo′Bo′ locomotive derived from the narrow-gauge EF class locomotives supplied by Brush Traction to the New Zealand Railways Corporation and won the contract with an initial order of 40 in July 1989.

The main traction electrical system consists of: (Note: Details from Brush Traction in 2011, some figures assumed correct only for rebuilt locomotives.) two pantographs (duplicated for redundancy) collecting a 25 kV AC supply which feeds the main transformer, with separate output windings rectified to a DC link (one per bogie) using four quadrant converters. The direct current drives a three-phase inverter, which powers two asynchronous three-phase induction motors. There are two additional output windings on the transformer for the locomotive's auxiliaries and to supply power to the train vehicles.

The bogies were a fabricated steel design, with coil spring primary suspension. The traction motors and gearboxes (one per axle) were mounted to the bogie frame and connected to the wheels by a flexibly coupled quill drive. Traction links were connected to the bogie frame at a height of 200 mm (7.87 in) above rail. The locomotive superstructure is supported on coil springs on a central swing bolster, and the centre bogie allows 200 mm (7.87 in) of lateral movement to negotiate small-radius curves. Yaw dampers are also fitted.

The locomotive superstructure is a stressed-skin monocoque design. Both the bogies and superstructures were fabricated by Qualter, Hall and Company of Barnsley.

The driver's cab and exterior design of the locomotives was undertaken by DCA Design. Side windows in the locomotive cab are omitted to prevent 'segment flicker' caused by fast running in the tunnel, a potential distraction and cause of operator drowsiness. The operator's cabin is air conditioned and pressurised for comfort. The locomotive uses in-cab TVM 430 signalling. The driving cab also incorporates train manager's facilities, including safety systems such as CCTV, alarms and communication links. There is a second driving position for shunting at the rear of the locomotive. (Note: The second driving position was omitted on later builds.)

== Testing and operations ==
The initial order for 40 units was reduced to 38, numbered 9001 to 9038. The first locomotive was completed in 1992, and two units (9003 and 9004) were tested at the Velim test track in the Czech Republic. Locomotive 9004 started its required 50,000-kilometre endurance test at Velim on 17 August 1993 and finished it on 23 September 1993.

The locomotives are maintained at the Eurotunnel depot located just beside Eurotunnel Calais Terminal at Coquelles near Calais, France. (Note: 50.922664°N 1.822448°E Coquelles Eurotunnel depot)

The formal opening took place on 6 May 1994 with Queen Elizabeth II and François Mitterrand travelling on a shuttle through the tunnel.

The 1996 Channel Tunnel fire damaged locomotive 9030 beyond repair. It was scrapped in 1997 at the Coquelles depot.

== Later subclasses ==
=== 9100 subseries ===
In 1997, Eurotunnel ordered five more locomotives and in 1998 the order was increased to a total of 14. This second batch of locomotives also had small improvements compared to the originals, including IGBT-based traction inverters instead of GTO-based and one inverter per motor instead of one per bogie.

This second batch of locomotives is numbered in the 9100 series (9101 to 9113) except for one locomotive, 9040 which was purchased as a replacement for 9030, the locomotive destroyed in the 1996 fire.

=== 9700 subseries ===
In 1999, Eurotunnel ordered seven locomotives with an increased power of 7 MW (9,387 hp). This third batch of locomotives was delivered between 2001 and 2003, and is numbered in the 9700 series (9701 to 9707). The higher power output allowed an increase in the length and weight of cargo shuttle trains.

=== 9800 subseries ===
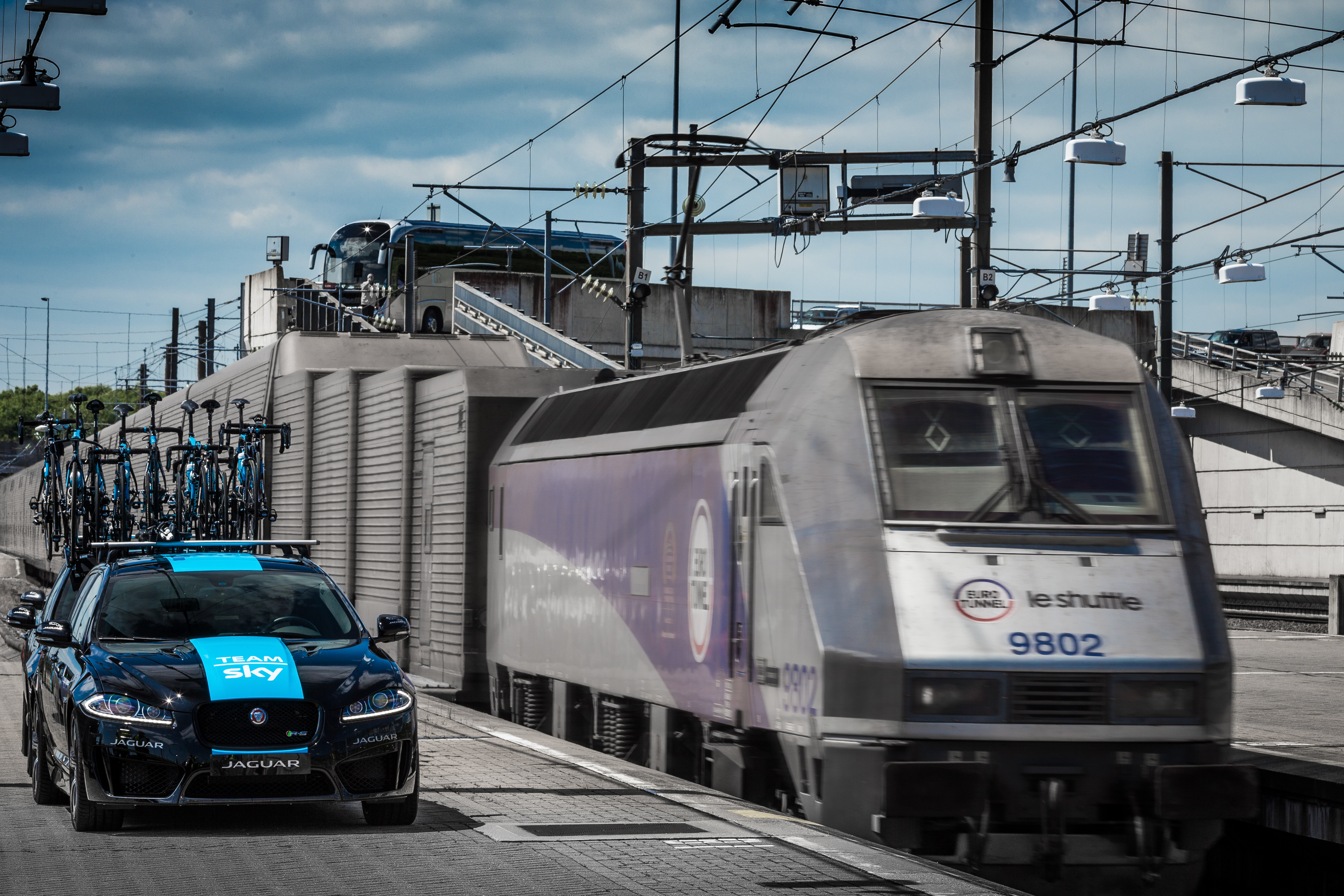
Eurotunnel 9802 locomotive alongside a Jaguar XF Sportbrake from the 2014 Tour de France team of Team Sky.

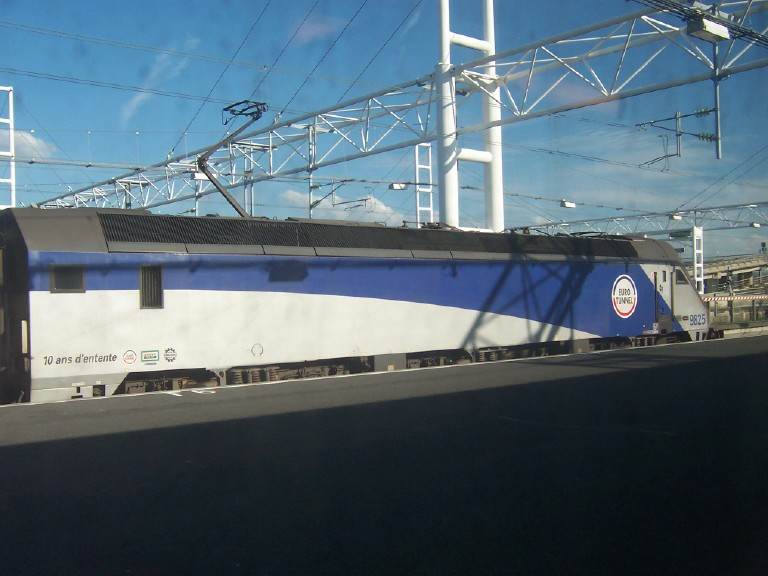
Side view of Eurotunnel 9825 locomotive

Since 2000, Eurotunnel has been slowly rebuilding the older 9000 and 9100 series locomotives from 5.6 to 7 MW (7,500 to 9,400 hp), replacing the main transformer, traction converters and motors. These rebuilt locomotives are numbered in the 9800 series.

By late 2017 of the 57 locomotives, 45 of them had been upgraded to the 7 MW (9,400 hp) standard, while the remaining 12 had the original 5.6 MW (7,500 hp) power.

Number range	Built	Power	Notes
9001–9038	1992–1994	5.6 MW (7,500 hp)	9030 withdrawn due to fire damage
9040	1998	5.6 MW (7,500 hp)	Built to replace fire-damaged locomotive 9030
9101–9113	1998–2001	5.6 MW (7,500 hp)	Dedicated to freight shuttles
9701–9707	2001–2002	7 MW (9,400 hp)	Dedicated to freight shuttles
9801–	Rebuilt 2004–2012	7 MW (9,400 hp)	Rebuilt from 5.6 MW (7,500 hp) machines

=== Names ===
After introduction the locomotives were named after opera singers. In 1997 four units were named Jungfraujoch, Lötschberg, Gotthard and Furkatunnel, after Swiss rail tunnels.

Named locomotives
Number	Name
9005	Jessye Norman
9007	Dame Joan Sutherland
9011	José van Dam
9013	Maria Callas
9015	Lötschberg 1913
9018	Wilhelmenia Fernandez
9022	Dame Janet Baker
9024	Gotthard 1882
9026	Furkatunnel 1982
9029	Thomas Allen
9033	Montserrat Caballé
9036	Alain Fondary
9037	Gabriel Bacquier
9801	Lesley Garrett
9802	Stuart Burrows
9803	Benjamin Luxon
9804	Victoria de los Ángeles
9806	Régine Crespin
9808	Elisabeth Söderström
9809	Françoise Pollet
9810	Jean-Philippe Courtis
9812	Luciano Pavarotti
9814	Lucia Popp
9816	Willard White
9819	Maria Ewing
9820	Nicolai Ghiaurov
9821	Teresa Berganza
9823	Dame Elisabeth Schwarzkopf
9825	Jungfraujoch 1912
9827	Barbara Hendricks
9828	Kiri Te Kanawa
9831	Plácido Domingo
9832	Renata Tebaldi
9834	Mirella Freni
9835	Nicolai Gedda
9838	Hildegard Behrens
