= Bo-Bo-Bo =

Type of locomotive

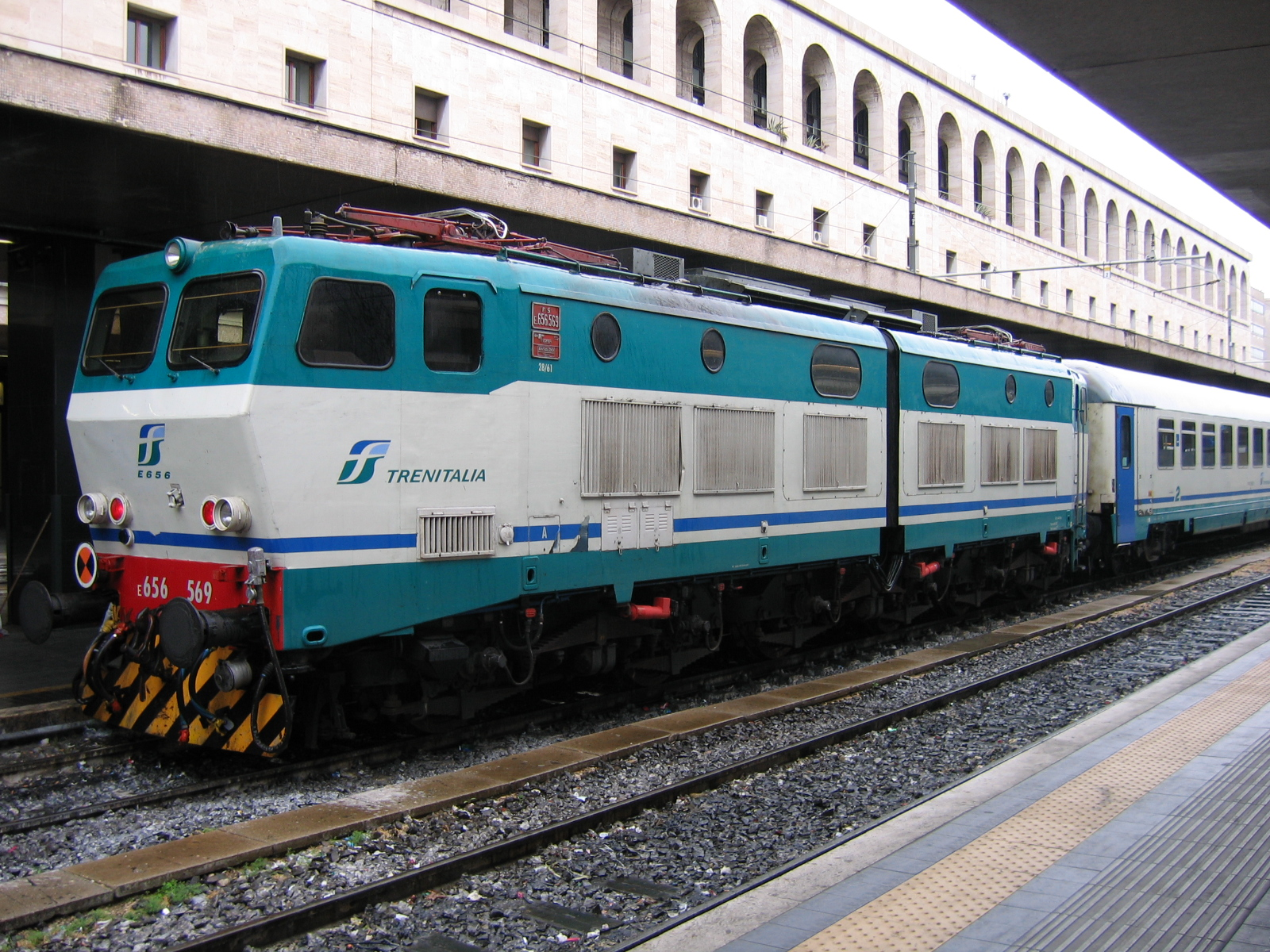
Italian articulated Bo-Bo-Bo E656 electric locomotive, Rome, June 2, 2006

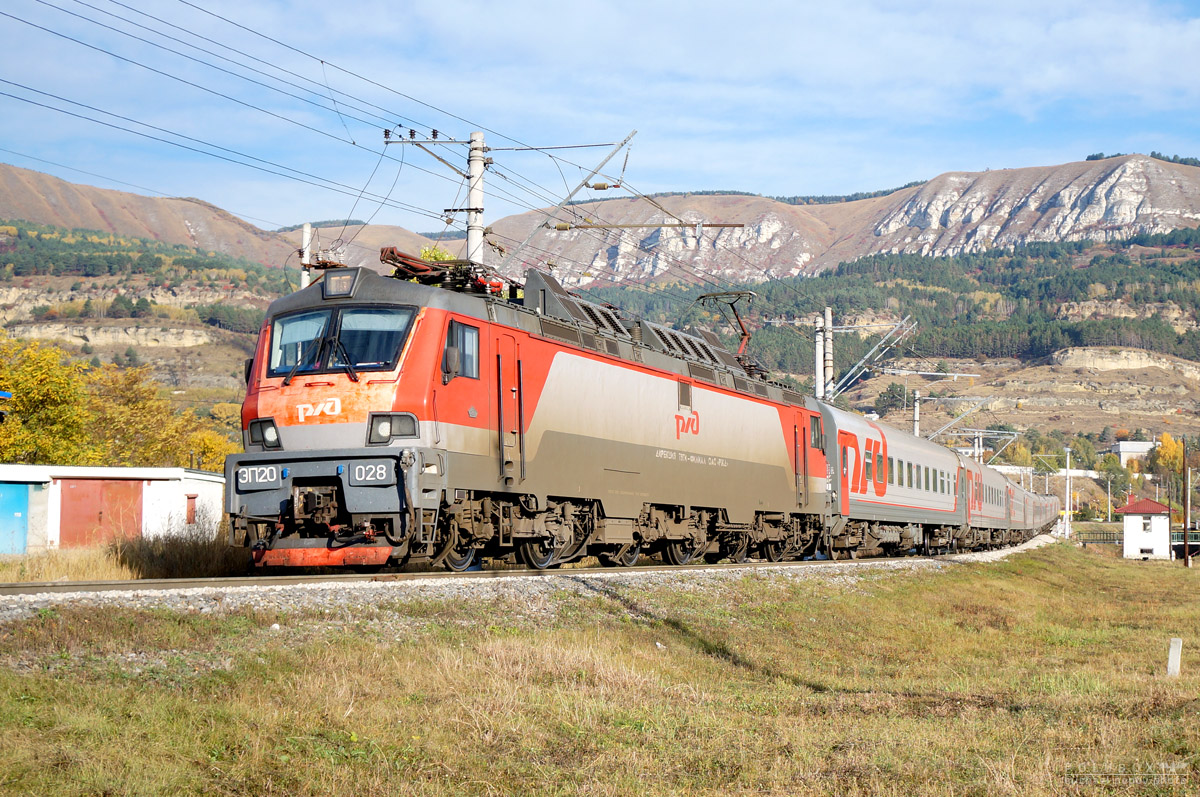
Russian Bo-Bo-Bo EP20 electric locomotive

A Bo-Bo-Bo or Bo′Bo′Bo′ (UIC classification) is a locomotive with three independent two-axle bogies with all axles powered by separate traction motors. In the AAR system, this is simplified to B-B-B due to the system only taking powered axles into consideration, not traction motors.

The Bo-Bo-Bo configuration is often used to lower axle weight while keeping lateral forces low compared to a locomotive with two three-axle bogies, thus allowing the locomotive to use lightly laid track, in particular narrow-gauge railways.

== Bo-Bo-Bo locomotives ==
The arrangement is extensively used on Italian and Japanese railways. Other examples include New Zealand's DJ, EW and EF classes; several Aurizon electric locomotives classes in Queensland Australia; the Eurotunnel Class 9 locomotives, which were themselves derived from the New Zealand EF class; the Swiss SBB Re 6/6 (Re 620); the Russian Railways VL65, EP1 (EP1M), EP10 and EP20; the Indian Railways WAG-6A and WAG-6B; and the South Korean Korail Class 8000. China imported 6K electric locomotive from Japan between 1986 and 1987. The Bo-Bo-Bo design was applied to SS7 series except SS7E. Locomotives of this type are also used on Myanmar railways.

The State Rail Authority of New South Wales, Australia built the last of its 86 Class electric locomotives (8650) in the Bo-Bo-Bo arrangement (called locally a Tri-Bo), but this did not prove successful and it spent long periods out of traffic undergoing repair.

The first Italian six-axle electric locomotives, such as the E.626, used a Bo′BoBo′ layout, where the two centre axles were mounted on a rigid frame and only the outer pairs on bogies.

This wheel arrangement requires either an articulated frame (becoming a Bo+Bo+Bo arrangement) or else significant side play on the center bogie. The Italian locomotives and New Zealand EW class are articulated, whereas the Eurotunnel and New Zealand EF and DJ class locomotives' central bogies have a lot of sideplay.

== B′B′B′ locomotives ==
A similar arrangement, but without separate traction motors for each axle, would be a B′B′B′ arrangement as UIC, indistinguishably B-B-B in AAR.

This arrangement has been used for electric locos with three monomotor bogies, such as the Italian FS Class E.632 of 1982.

== Bo′Bo′Bo′+Bo′Bo′Bo′ locomotives ==
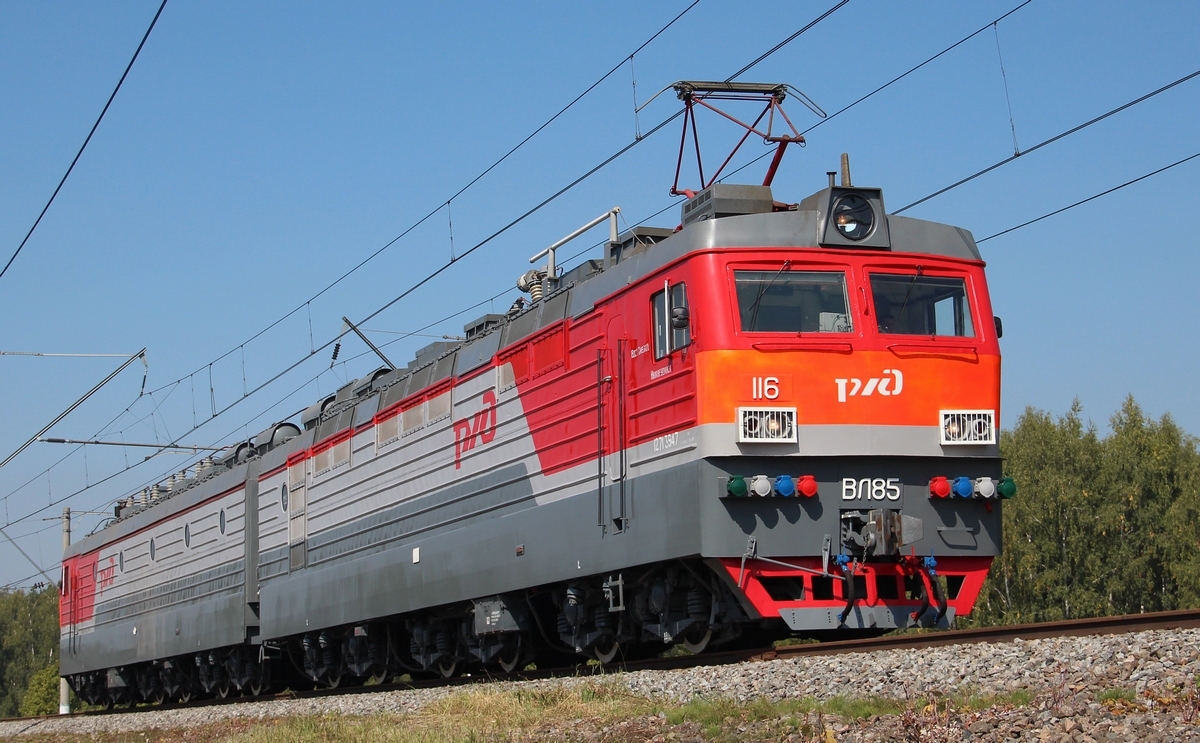
Russian Bo′Bo′Bo′+Bo′Bo′Bo′ VL85 electric locomotive

These are a pair of Bo′Bo′Bo′ locomotives semi-permanently coupled as a single unit. They are each constructed with a single cab, giving a cab at each end.

This layout includes Russian freight electric locomotives VL15, VL85, VL86f and the experimental gas turbine electric locomotive GT1h-001, which was converted from an electric locomotive VL15.

== See also ==
- B+B+B
- Bo-Bo
- Bo-Bo-Bo locomotives
- Co-Co locomotives
