= Class 251 =

Class 251 may refer to:

== Trains ==
- British Rail Class 251, the motor car for the Blue Pullman trains.
- DB Class 251, a narrow-gauge diesel-hydraulic locomotive built for the Deutsche Bundesbahn.
- DR Class E 251, East German electric locomotives used on Deutsche Reichsbahn.
- Renfe Class 251, a class of electric locomotives operated by Renfe.

== Submarines ==
- No.251 class auxiliary submarine chaser, a class of submarine chasers used during World War II in the Imperial Japanese Navy.
