= Ōtori-class torpedo boat =

Torpedo boat in the Japanese Empire

Ōtori class
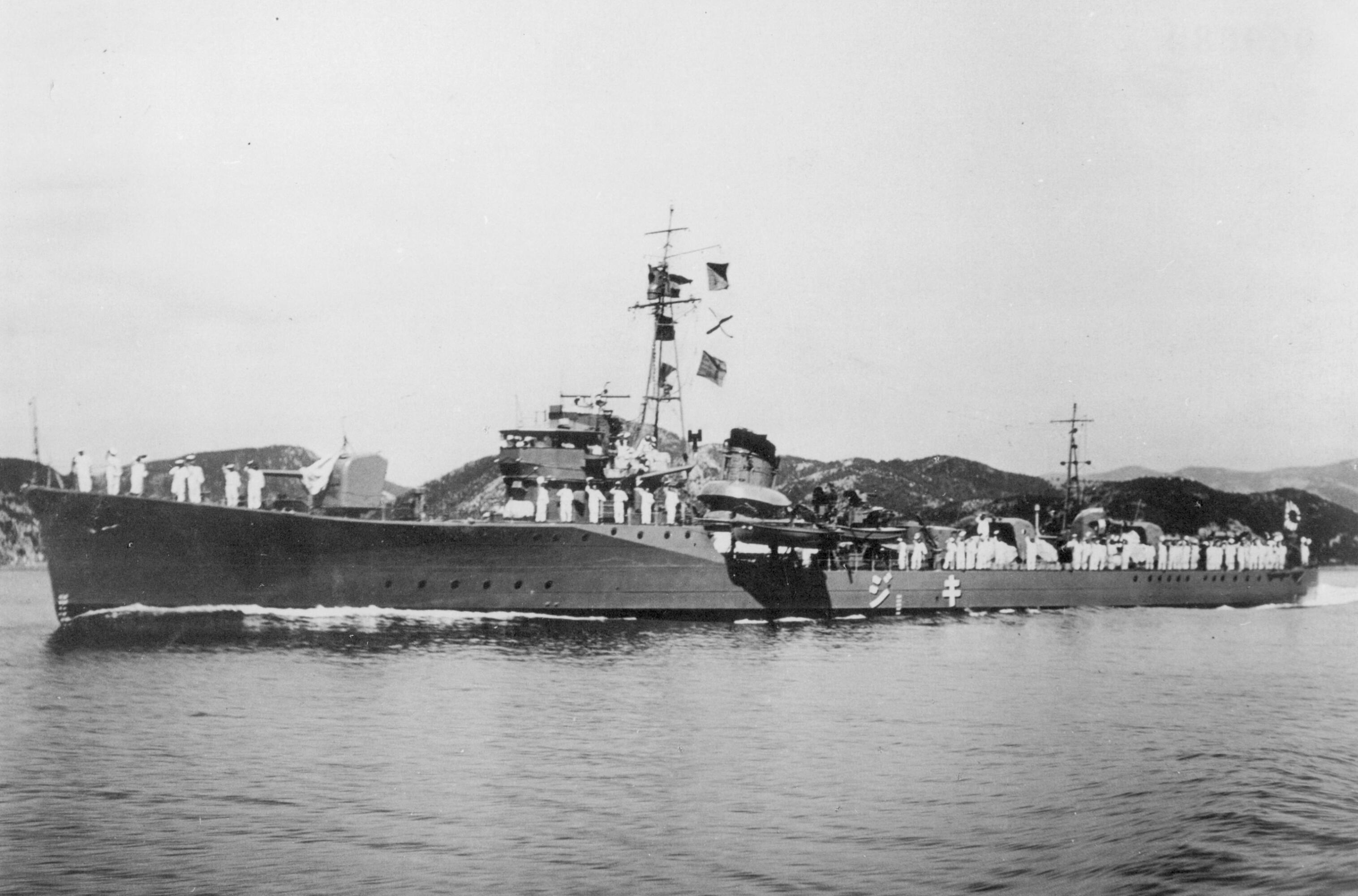
- Kiji 1937

Class overview
- Preceded by: Chidori class
- Succeeded by: Matsu class (small destroyers)
- Built: 1934-1937
- In commission: 1936-1946
- Planned: 16
- Completed: 8
- Cancelled: 8
- Lost: 7
- Retired: 1

General characteristics
- Type: Torpedo boat
- Displacement: 840 tons standard; 960 tons for battle condition
- Length: 88.5 m (290 ft 4 in) full; 85.0 m (278 ft 10 in) waterline
- Beam: 8.18 m (26 ft 10 in)
- Draft: 2.76 m (9 ft 1 in)
- Depth: 4.85 m (15 ft 11 in)
- Propulsion: 2 × Kampon water tube boilers; 2 × Kanpon impulse turbines; 2 × shafts, 19,000 shp (14,000 kW)
- Speed: 30.5 knots (56.5 km/h; 35.1 mph)
- Range: 4,000 nmi (7,400 km; 4,600 mi) at 14 kn (26 km/h; 16 mph)
- Complement: 129
- Armament: Ōtori, 1936; 3 × 12 cm (4.7 in)/45 11th Year Type guns (3×1); 1 × Vickers 40 mm AA gun; 1 × 11 mm machine gun; 3 × Type 94 Torpedo tubes (1×3); 3 × 6th Year Type torpedoes; 1 x Type 94 depth charge launcher; 2 × paravanes; Hiyodori, August 1944; 2 × 12 cm (4.7 in)/45 11th Year Type guns (2×1); 11 × Type 96 25 mm (0.98 in) AA guns; 3 × Type 94 Torpedo tubes (1×3); 3 × 6th Year Type torpedoes; 48 × depth charges

The Ōtori-class torpedo boat (鴻型水雷艇, Ōtori-gata suiraitei) were a class of eight fast torpedo boats of the Imperial Japanese Navy built before and operated during World War II.

== Development ==
To circumvent the terms of the 1930 London Naval Treaty, which limited its total destroyer tonnage the Imperial Japanese Navy designed the Chidori class torpedo boat, but planned to arm it with half the armament of a Fubuki class destroyer. The resultant design was top-heavy and unstable, resulting in the 1934 Tomozuru Incident, in which one of the Chidori-class vessels capsized. The subsequent investigation revealed the fundamental design flaw, and the four vessels in the class which had been completed were extensively rebuilt, and the remaining sixteen vessels projected were cancelled in favor of a new design which would address these design issues from the beginning. Sixteen Ōtori-class vessels were ordered in the 1934 2nd Naval Armaments Supplement Programme, of which eight were completed between 1936 and 1937. The remaining eight were cancelled in favor of building additional submarine chasers.

== Design ==
Benefiting from the redesign of the Chidori-class, the Ōtori-class had a slightly longer hull with an increased beam. The bridge structure was also lower than on the Chidori-class to help keep the center-of-gravity low. Two Kampon geared turbines powered by two Kampon water-tube boilers produced a total of 19,000 shaft horsepower (14,000 kW), which gave the ships more power than the Chidori-class, and thus a slightly higher maximum speed of 30.0 knots (34.5 mph; 55.6 km/h)

The armament of the Ōtori-class was almost the same as for the rebuilt Chidori-class with a main battery of three single 12 cm/45 3rd Year Type naval guns which could elevate to 55 degrees for a limited anti-aircraft capability. The torpedo mount was upgraded from a twin to a triple torpedo launcher, and a single Type 94 depth charge launcher was carried. However, anti-aircraft weaponry was only a single license-built Vickers 40 mm (2 pounder pom pom).

During the Pacific War, in 1944 survivors had the aft gun removed, and up to three twin-mount and five single-mount Type 96 25mm AA guns were installed as well as a Type 22 and a Type 13 radar. The number of depth charges was increased to 48.

== Operational service ==
The Ōtori-class were used extensively from the start of the Pacific War to escort invasion convoys to the Philippines, Dutch East Indies and the Solomon Islands. Hiyodori sank the USS Amberjack (SS-219) during the Solomon Islands campaign on 16 February 1943. Seven of the eight ships in the class were sunk by submarines or air attack in the Pacific or the South China Sea and only Kiji survived to the end of the war.

== Ships in class ==
Ship	Kanji	Builder	Laid down	Launched	Completed	Fate
Ōtori	鴻, 'stork'	Maizuru Naval Arsenal	8 Nov 1934	25 Apr 1935	10 Oct 1936	Sunk by aircraft of Task Force 58 NW of Saipan, 12 Jun 1944
Hiyodori	鵯, 'brown-eared bulbul'	Ishikawajima Shipyards	26 Nov 1934	25 Oct 1935	20 Dec 1936	Sunk by USS Gunnel in South China Sea, 17 Nov 1944
Hayabusa	隼, 'peregrine falcon'	Yokohama Dock Company	19 Dec 1934	28 Oct 1935	7 Dec 1936	Sunk by aircraft in Sibuyan Sea, 24 Sep 1944
Kasasagi	鵲, 'magpie'	Ōsaka Iron Works	4 Mar 1935	18 Oct 1935	15 Jan 1937	Sunk by USS Bluefish in Flores Sea, 26 Sep 1943
Kiji	雉, 'pheasant'	Mitsui Engineering & Shipbuilding, Tamano	24 Oct 1935	26 Jan 1937	31 Jul 1937	Surrendered to Soviet Union at Nakhodka, on 3 Oct 1947; Renamed Vnimatel'nyy; Decommissioned 31 Oct 1957
Kari	雁, 'wild goose'	Yokohama Dock Company	11 May 1936	20 Jan 1937	20 Sep 1937	Sunk by USS Baya in Java Sea, 16 July 1945
Sagi	鷺, 'snowy heron'	Harima Shipyards	20 May 1936	30 Jan 1937	31 Jul 1937	Sunk by USS Gunnel W of Luzon, 8 Nov 1944
Hato	鳩, 'dove'	Ishikawajima Shipyards	28 May 1936	25 Jan 1937	7 Aug 1937	Sunk by aircraft at Hong Kong, 16 Oct 1944
Hatsutaka	初鷹	—N/a	—N/a	—N/a	—N/a	Cancelled, 1937
Aotaka	蒼鷹	—N/a	—N/a	—N/a	—N/a	Cancelled, 1937
Wakataka	若鷹	—N/a	—N/a	—N/a	—N/a	Cancelled, 1937
Kumataka	熊鷹	—N/a	—N/a	—N/a	—N/a	Cancelled, 1937
Yamadori	山鳥	—N/a	—N/a	—N/a	—N/a	Cancelled, 1937
Mizutori	水鳥	—N/a	—N/a	—N/a	—N/a	Cancelled, 1937
Umidori	海鳥	—N/a	—N/a	—N/a	—N/a	Cancelled, 1937
Komadori	駒鳥	—N/a	—N/a	—N/a	—N/a	Cancelled, 1937
