= Hiyodori =

Hiyodori may refer to:

- Hiyodori, a Otori-class torpedo boat
- Hiyodori sōshi, a novel by Eiji Yoshikawa which has been made into a film
  - Hiyodori sōshi, a 1928 film adaptation by Kichinosuke Hitomi
  - Hiyodori sōshi, a 1933 film adaptation by Junzō Sone
  - Hiyodori sōshi, a 1952 film adaptation by Tai Kato
  - Hiyodori sōshi, a 1954 film adaptation by Kōkichi Uchide
- Hiyodori: 13 Japanese Birds Pt. 9, an album by Merzbow
