= 2nd Naval Armaments Supplement Programme =

Second of four Imperial Japanese Naval Expansion plans

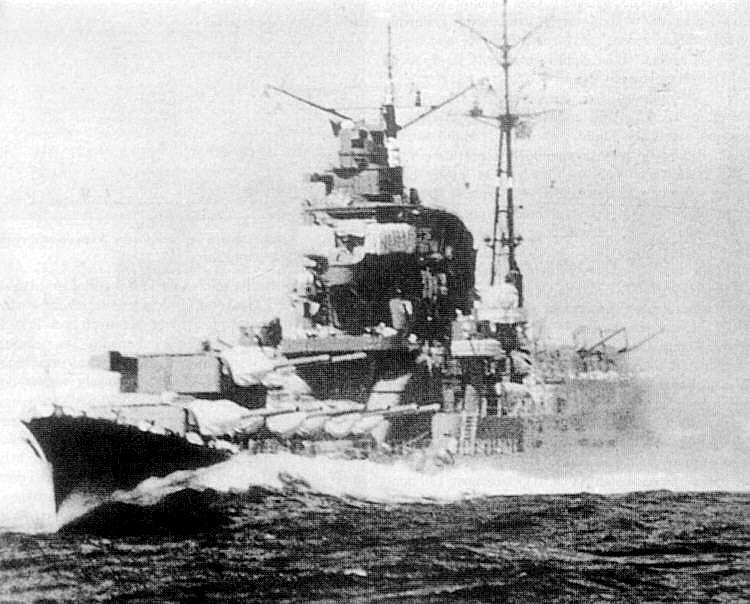
Construction of the cruiser Tone was authorized under the "Circle-2 Plan"

The 2nd Naval Armaments Supplement Programme (第二次補充計画, Dai-Ni-Ji Hojū Keikaku) otherwise known as the "Circle 2 Plan" (マル2計画, Maru 2 Keikaku) was the second of four expansion plans of the Imperial Japanese Navy between 1930 and the start of World War II.

== Background ==
The London Naval Treaty placed severe restrictions on Japan's naval capabilities vis-a-vis the United States Navy and the British Royal Navy in terms of tonnage and numbers of capital warships. The response of the Imperial Japanese Navy General Staff was to initiate a construction program to build new warships to the allotted tonnage limits in each of the restricted categories, and to invest in types of warships and weaponry not specifically covered by the provisions of the treaty.

The "Circle One" plan was submitted by the Naval Ministry and approved by the Cabinet in November 1930, and officially ratified by the Diet of Japan in 1931. It called for the construction of 39 new combat vessels, centering on four of the new Mogami-class cruisers, and expansion of the Imperial Japanese Navy Air Service to 14 Naval Air Groups. However, plans for a second expansion budget were delayed by the Tomozuru Incident and IJN 4th Fleet Incident, when it was revealed that the basic designs of many Japanese warships were flawed due to poor construction techniques and instability caused by attempting to mount too much weaponry on too small a displacement hull. As a result, most of the naval budget in 1932–1933 was absorbed in modifications to rectify issues with existing equipment.

In 1934, the Naval Ministry submitted its second expansion plan to the Cabinet and Diet for approval. This plan was a multiyear (four year) budget, covering the construction of 48 new warships and creation of eight new Naval Air Groups. A total of 431,680,800 Yen was allotted for warship construction and 33,000,000 Yen for naval aviation.

== Table of vessels ==
Category	Class	Planned	Completed	Converted	Cancelled
Heavy cruiser	Tone	2	Tone, Chikuma	Converted to heavy cruiser.	
Aircraft carrier	Sōryū	1	Sōryū	One planned vessel was converted to Hiryū instead.	
Aircraft carrier	Hiryū	1	Hiryū		
Destroyer	Shiratsuyu	4	Umikaze, Yamakaze, Kawakaze, Suzukaze		
Destroyer	Asashio	10	Asashio, Ōshio, Michishio, Arashio, Yamagumo, Natsugumo, Asagumo, Minegumo, Arare, Kasumi		
Torpedo boat	Ōtori	16	Ōtori, Hiyodori, Hayabusa, Kasasagi, Kiji, Kari, Sagi, Hato		8 vessels were cancelled.
Cruiser submarine	I-7	2	I-7, I-8		
Large sized submarine	I-74	2	I-74, I-75		
Seaplane tender Type-A (10,000-ton class)	Chitose	2	Chitose, Chiyoda		
Seaplane tender Type-B (9,000-ton class)	Mizuho	1	Mizuho		
Submarine chaser	No.3	1	No.3		
Submarine chaser (Small: diesel)	No.51	2	No.51, No.52		
Submarine chaser (Small: turbine)	No.53	1	No.53		
Fleet oiler	Tsurugizaki	2	Tsurugizaki, Takasaki	Both converted into Shōhō-class aircraft carriers prior to the war, in which both were lost.	
Repair ship	Akashi	1	Akashi		

== See also ==
- 1st Naval Armaments Supplement Programme (Maru 1 Keikaku, 1931)
- 3rd Naval Armaments Supplement Programme (Maru 3 Keikaku, 1937)
- 4th Naval Armaments Supplement Programme (Maru 4 Keikaku, 1939)
- Temporal Naval Armaments Supplement Programme (Maru Rin Keikaku, 1940)
- Rapidly Naval Armaments Supplement Programme (Maru Kyū Keikaku, 1941)
- Additional Naval Armaments Supplement Programme (Maru Tui Keikaku, 1941)
- 5th Naval Armaments Supplement Programme (Maru 5 Keikaku, 1941)
- 6th Naval Armaments Supplement Programme (Maru 6 Keikaku, 1942)
- Modified 5th Naval Armaments Supplement Programme (Kai-Maru 5 Keikaku, 1942)
- Wartime Naval Armaments Supplement Programme (Maru Sen Keikaku, 1944)
