= JNR Class EF66 =

Japanese locomotive class

Class EF66
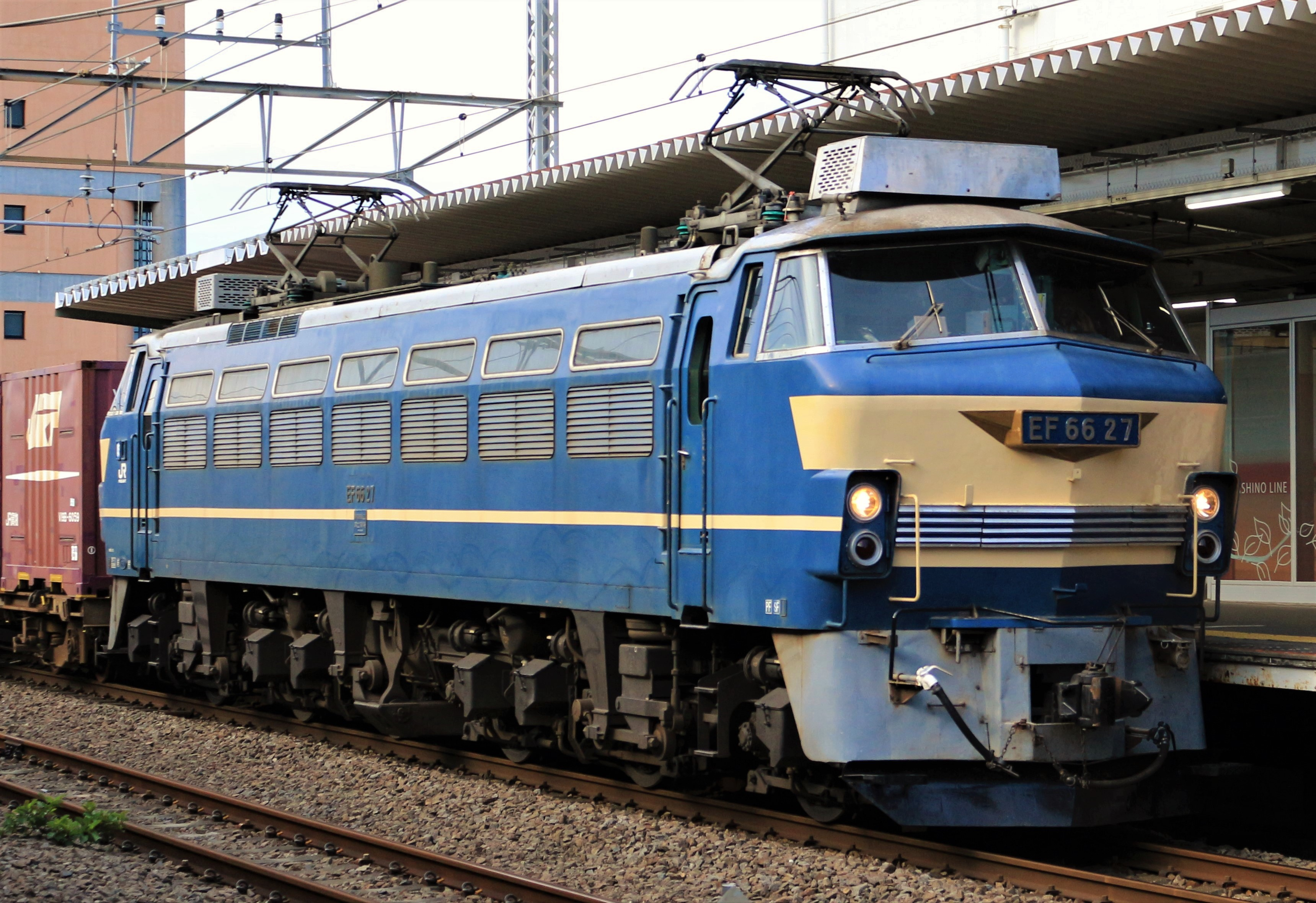
- JR Freight EF66-27 in 2022
Type and origin
- Builder: Kawasaki Sharyo, Kawasaki Heavy Industries, Kisha Seizo, Toshiba
- Total produced: 89
Specifications
- Configuration
  - AAR: B-B-B
  - UIC: Bo′Bo′Bo′
  - Commonwealth: Bo-Bo-Bo
- Gauge: 1,067 mm (3 ft 6 in)
- Bogies: DT133A (outer), DT134A (centre)
- Wheel diameter: 1,120 mm (44.09 in)
- Length: 18,200 mm (59 ft 8 1/2 in)
- Width: 2,800 mm (9 ft 2 1/4 in)
- Height: 4,200 mm (13 ft 9 3/8 in)
- Loco weight: 100.8 tonnes (99.2 long tons; 111.1 short tons)
- Electric system/s: 1,500 V DC overhead lines
- Current pickup: Pantograph
- Traction motors: DC motors (MT56) (x6)
- Transmission: Single-stage reduction gear (20:71), flexible quill drive
Performance figures
- Maximum speed: 110 km/h (70 mph)
- Power output: 3.9 MW (5,200 hp)
- Tractive effort: 192 kN (43,000 lb_{f})
Career
- Operators: ■ JNR; ■ JR West; ■ JR Freight
- Number in class: 39 (as of 1 April 2016)
- Delivered: 1966
- Withdrawn: EF66-0 1992–2024 (All Units)
- Disposition: In service
- This train won the 12th Blue Ribbon Award in 1969.

The Class EF66 (EF66形) is a six-axle, three-bogied (Bo′Bo′Bo′) DC electric locomotive designed for fast freight used by Japanese National Railways (JNR) and later operated by its descendants JR West and JR Freight. As of 1 April 2016, 39 locomotives remained in service, all operated by JR Freight.

== Variants ==
- EF66-900: Prototype locomotive EF66 901, delivered in 1966
- EF66-0: Full-production type (EF66 1 – 55), built 1968 to 1975
- EF66-100: Later type (EF66 101 – 133), built 1989 to 1991

== Technical ==
The locomotives were designed to be able to haul 1,000-tonne trains at 100 km/h (60 mph). Each traction motor has a power output of 650 kW (870 hp), (about 50% more powerful than the Class EF65). The bogies have an air suspension system to limit the impulsive forces on the track.

== Operations ==
During the JNR era, these locomotives were used for freight trains and also for passenger work – primarily hauling night trains such as the Hayabusa sleeping car limited express.

By 1 April 2009, 73 EF66s (including all 33 EF66-100s) were in service, with 63 owned by JR Freight (all based at Suita Depot in Osaka), and 10 owned by JR West (all based at Shimonoseki Depot). In the timetable revision in 2022 all EF66 Units were withdrawn from regular service.

As of 1 April 2016, 39 locomotives remained in service (six EF66-0 and 33 EF66-100 locomotives), all operated by JR Freight.

As of July 2021 just two EF66-0 examples remain in service, those being EF66-27 & EF66-30

== History ==
=== Background ===
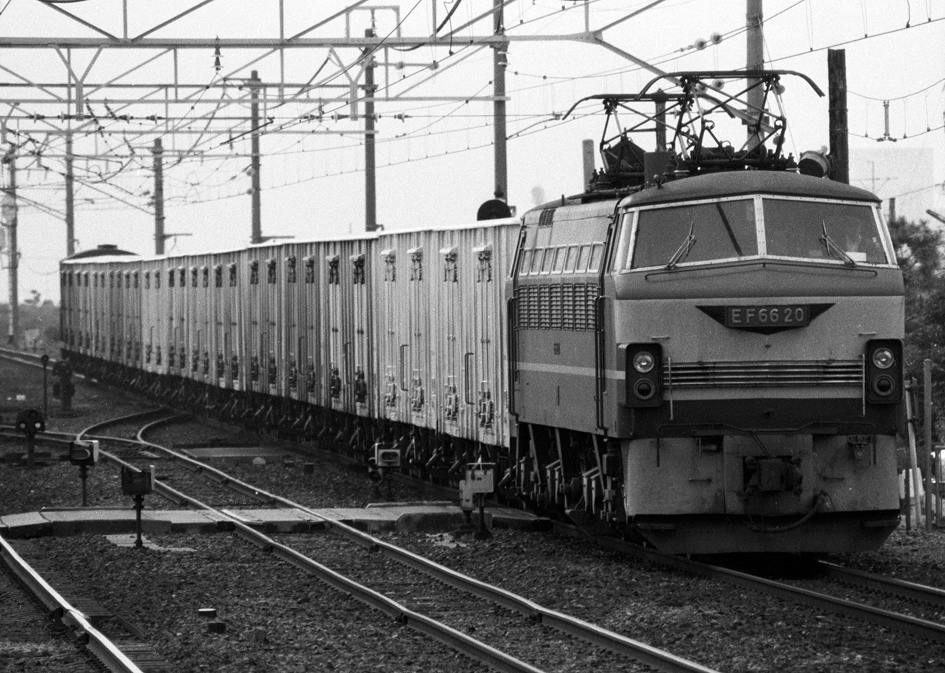
EF66 20 hauling a "Tobiuo" (flying fish) express freight train formed of ReSa 10000 series refrigerator cars in 1985

With the opening of the Meishin Expressway between Nagoya and Kobe in 1965 and the Tomei Expressway between Tokyo and Nagoya in 1968, JNR faced increasing competition for freight transport from road hauliers. JNR therefore developed the "10000 series" freight wagons (KoKi 10000 and KoKiFu 10000 container flat wagons, ReSa 10000 and ReMuFu 10000 refrigerated wagons, and WaKi 10000 bogie vans) capable of operating at 100 km/h (60 mph). Express freight services formed of these wagons were introduced on the Tokaido Main Line and Sanyo Main Line from October 1966 using Class EF65-500 electric locomotives built in 1965. These locomotives were designed to be used in pairs hauling 1,000-tonne freight trains, but as pairs of locomotives drew excessive current from the overhead wires, 1,000-tonne freight trains had to be split into 600-tonne and 400-tonne sections when operating on the Sanyo Main Line. This led to the need for a new locomotive design that would be capable of hauling 1,000-tonne trains singly.

=== Prototype ===
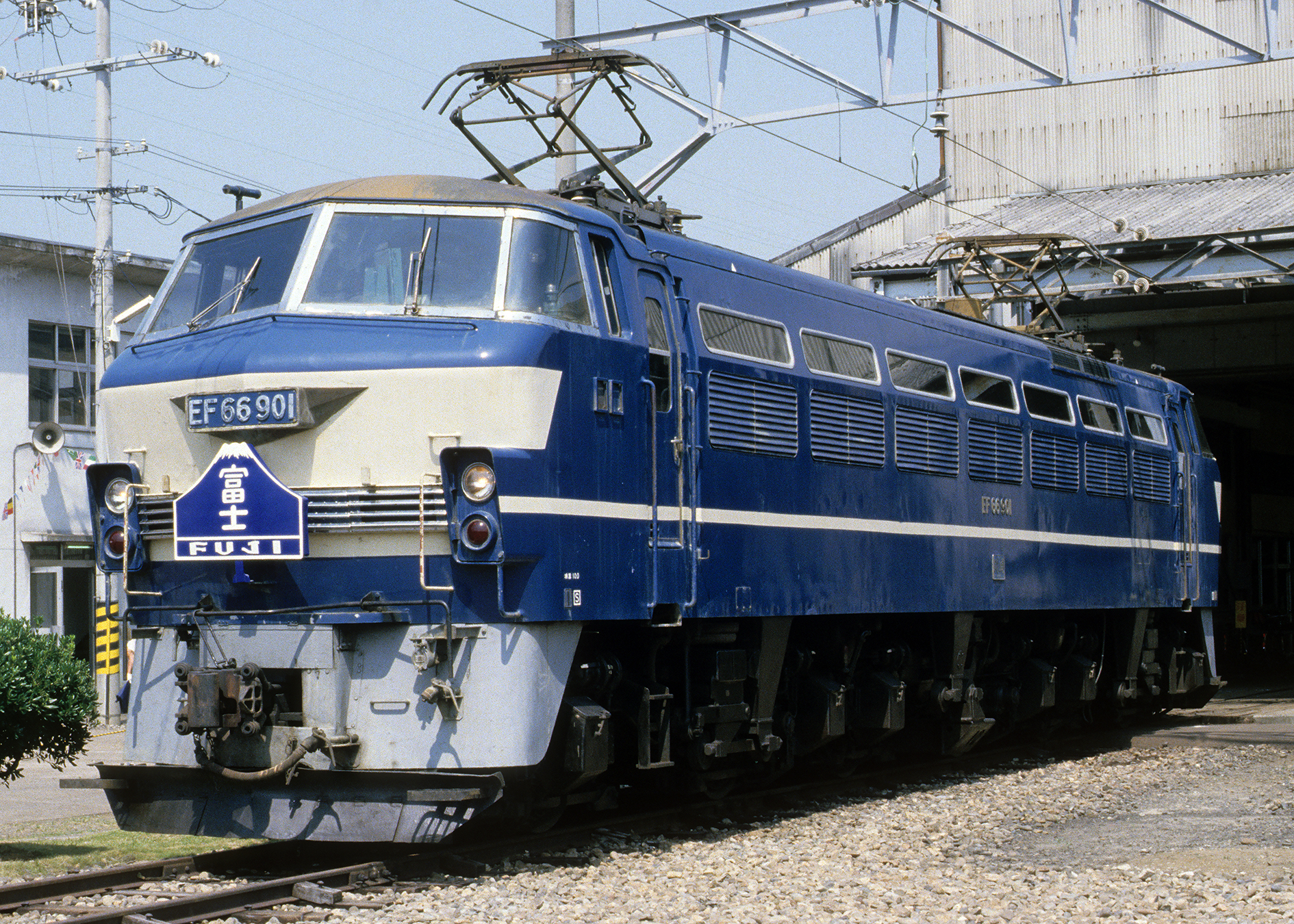
EF66 901 on display in 1985

A prototype locomotive, initially classified EF90 and numbered EF90 1, was built by Kawasaki Sharyo in 1966. It had a total power output of 3.9 MW (5,230 hp), making it the world's most powerful narrow-gauge locomotive at the time.

EF66 901 was retired from service in 1996, and has been stored at Hiroshima Depot since February 2001, but it was taken apart in March.

=== Full-production series ===
The production series of locomotives were delivered from 1968, with 55 built in two batches between 1968 and 1975.

The second batch of locomotives, EF66 21 to EF66 55, delivered between 1973 and 1975, incorporated a number of minor changes and improvements. Most noticeable was the extension of the cab roofs over the windscreens to reduce the deposition of abrasion dust from the pantographs on the windscreens. Some of the first-batch locomotives (EF66 1 to 20) were also subsequently modified with the "sun visor" style cab end roofs.

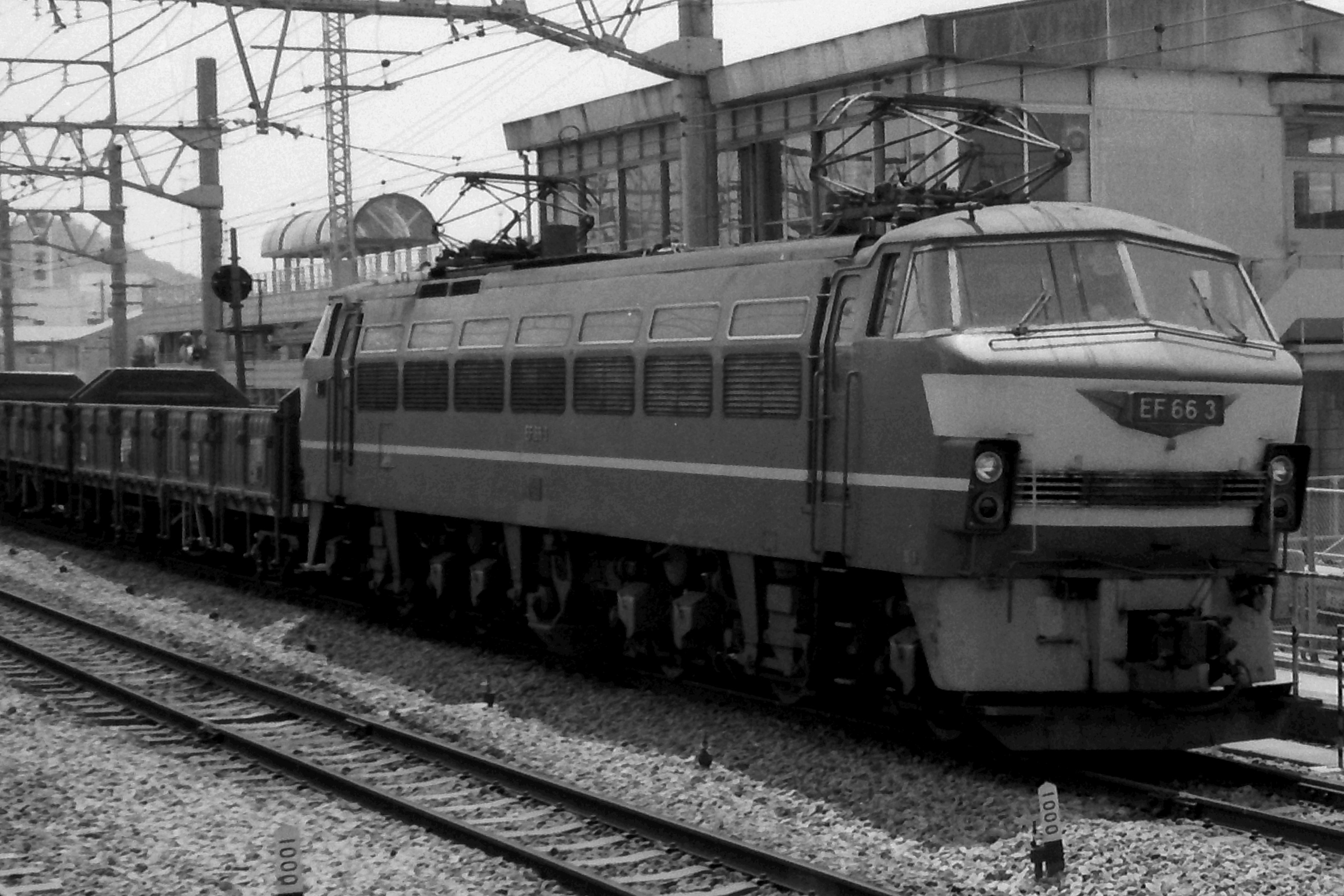
First-batch EF66 3 on a freight working in June 1984

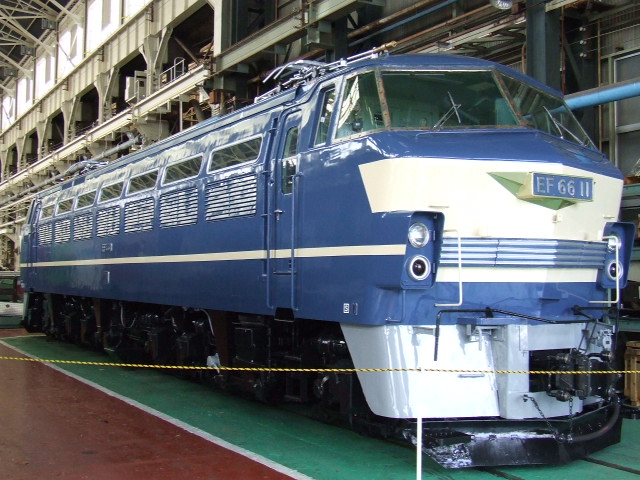
First-batch EF66 11 in 2007

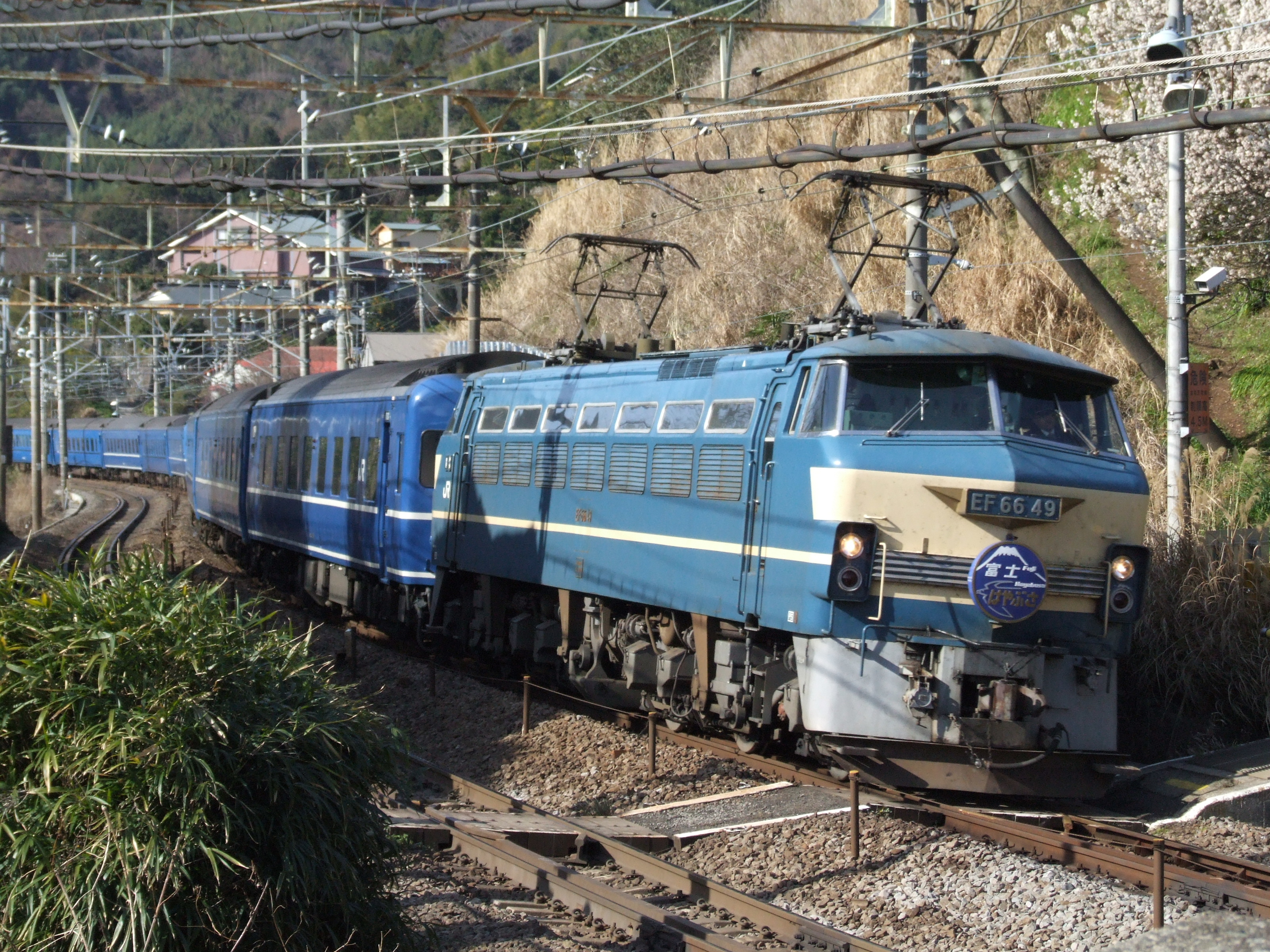
Second-batch EF66 49 on a sleeping car service in March 2009

=== Post-privatization ===
Following the privatisation of JNR on 1 April 1987, JR Freight received the prototype (EF66 901) and 39 of the original series (EF66 1 to EF66 39) as well as the Class EF66-100 machines. JR West obtained the remainder of the machines (EF66 40 to EF66 55) – a total of 16.

Shortly after privatization, JR Freight tried out a number of new experimental liveries on its various locomotives, and one Class EF66, locomotive number EF66 20, received an experimental cream and blue livery with large "JR" logos in August 1987. No other members of the class were reliveried, however, and EF66 20 received the new JR Freight two-tone blue livery when it underwent refurbishment in October 1993.

From 1988, JR Freight retrofitted a number of its EF66s (numbers 22– 4, 26–27, 30–33, 37) with roof-mounted cab air-conditioning units.

From 1993, JR Freight started refurbishing its fleet of EF66s (numbers 1–5, 7–10, 11–12, 16–39, 41, 44, 53, 55). Refurbishment included rewinding of the traction motor coils, removal of the former JNR decorations on the front-end number plates, and repainting into a two-tone blue livery similar to that carried by the EF66-100s. Locomotives refurbished from 2004 onward, however, received a simplified blue livery, similar to the original JNR-style livery.

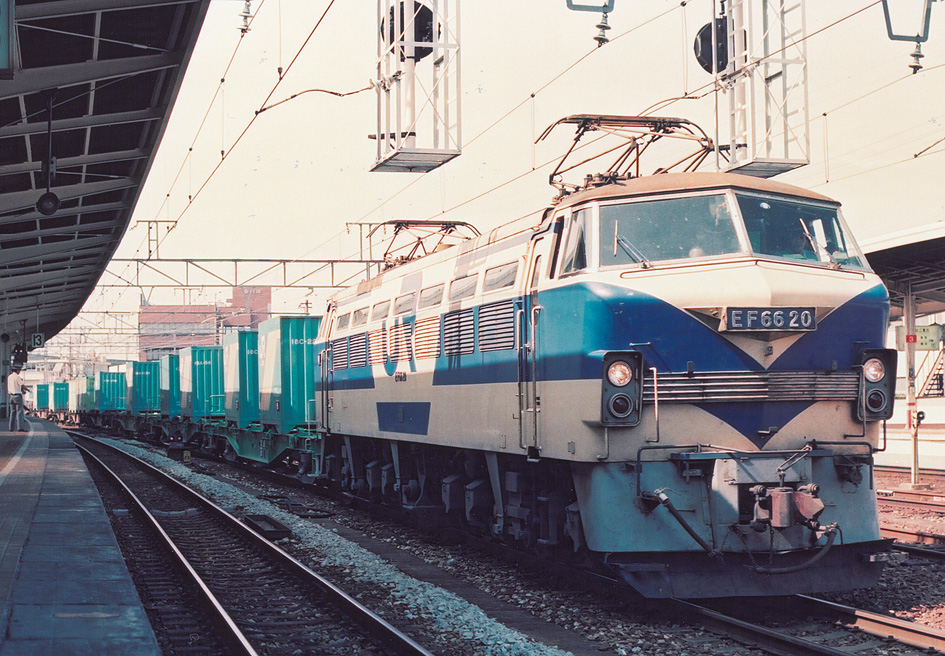
EF66 20 in experimental JR Freight livery in the late 1980s

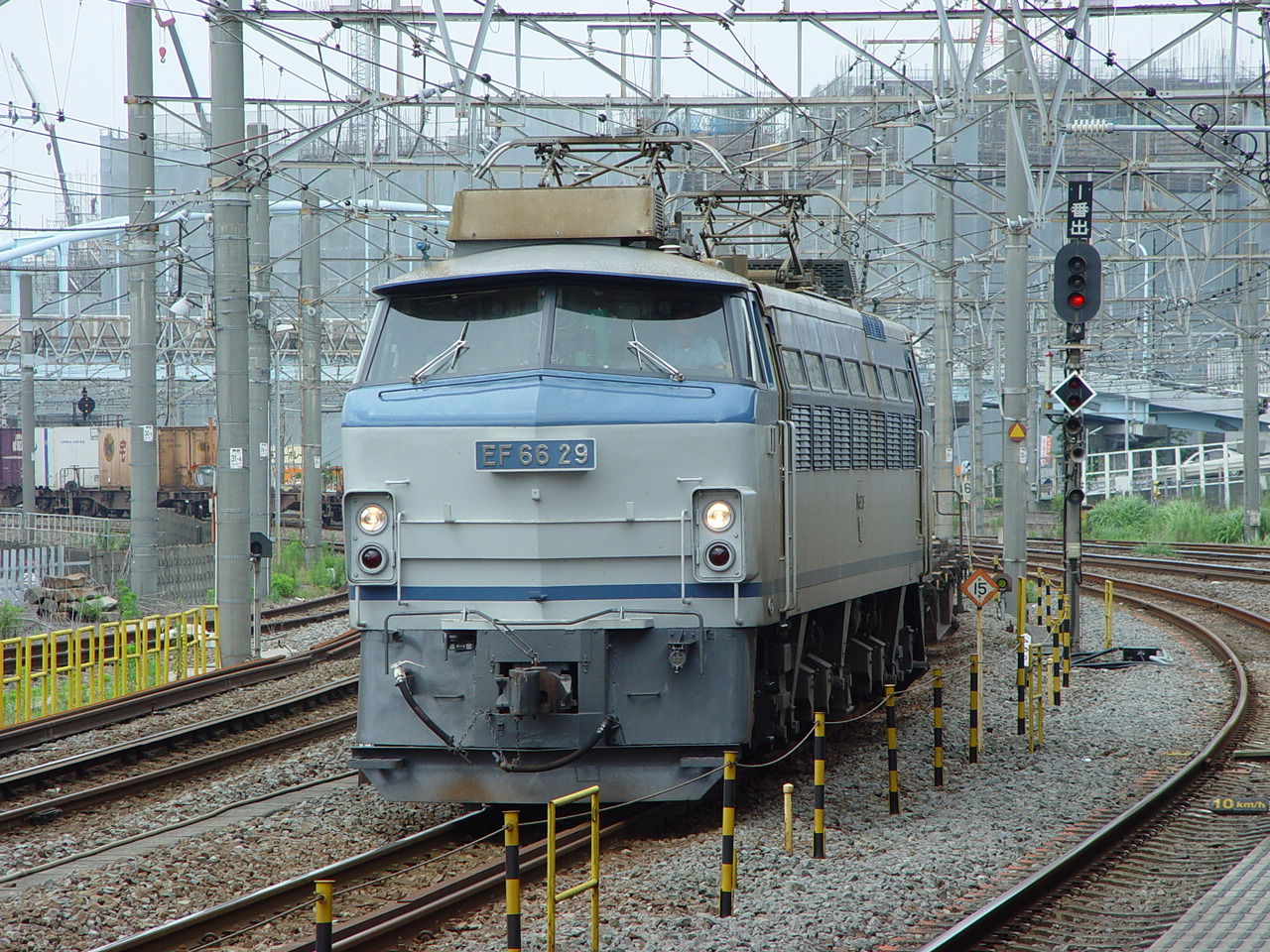
JR Freight EF66 29 in revised livery in June 2003

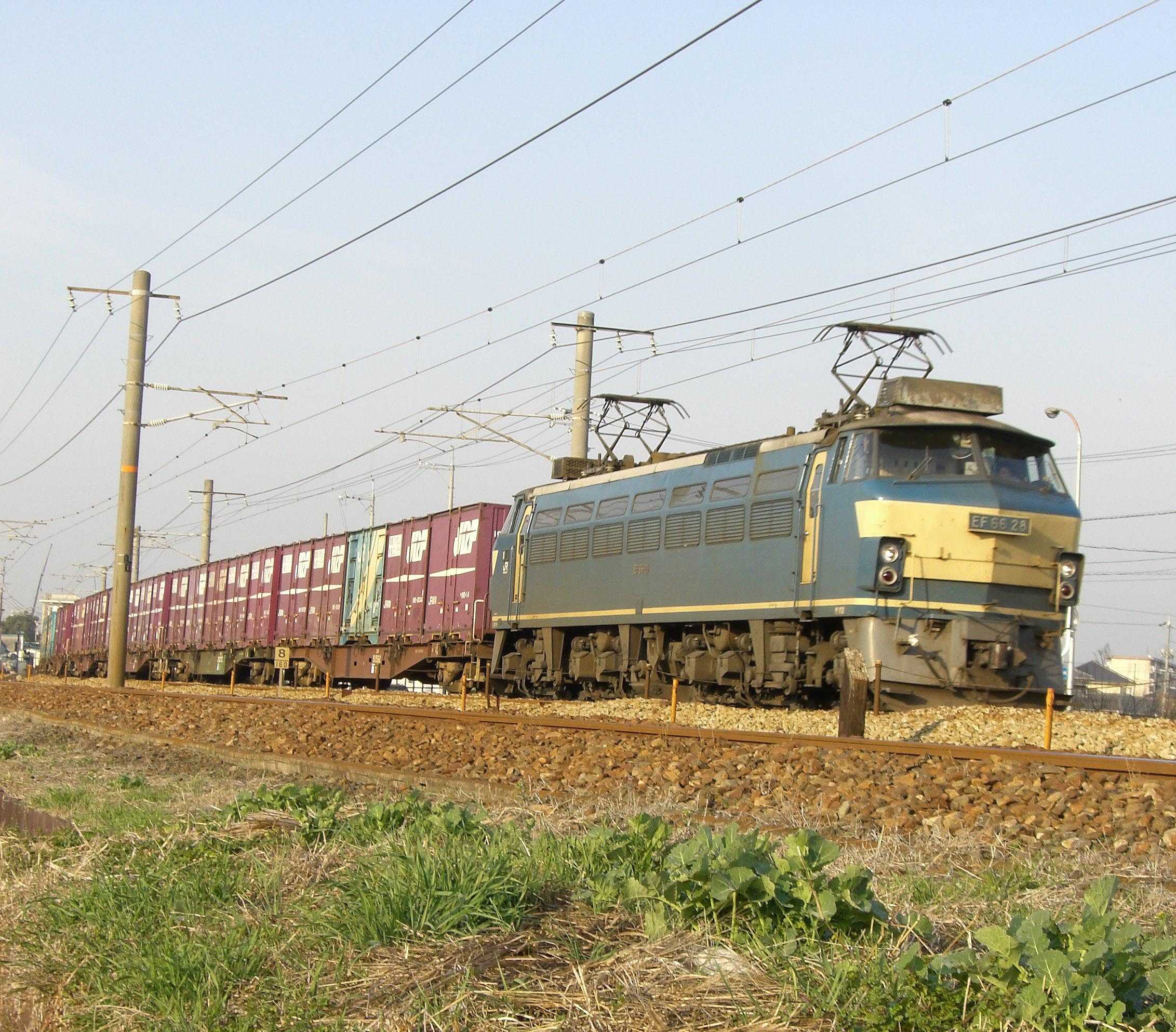
JR Freight EF66 28 in February 2007 in the later livery applied to refurbished locomotives

=== EF66-100 ===
Due to increased demand, JR Freight began building more EF66s in 1989. This batch of locomotives was classified EF66-100, with locomotive numbered EF66 101 to EF66 133. The Class EF66-100 locomotives were fundamentally the same design as the EF66-0, but with slightly more modern external styling. The driver's cabs are air-conditioned. The Class EF66 100 locomotives were also built in two batches, EF66 101 to 108 and EF66 109 to EF133. The second batch differed in having rectangular headlamps and tail lamps, while the first batch had round lamps.

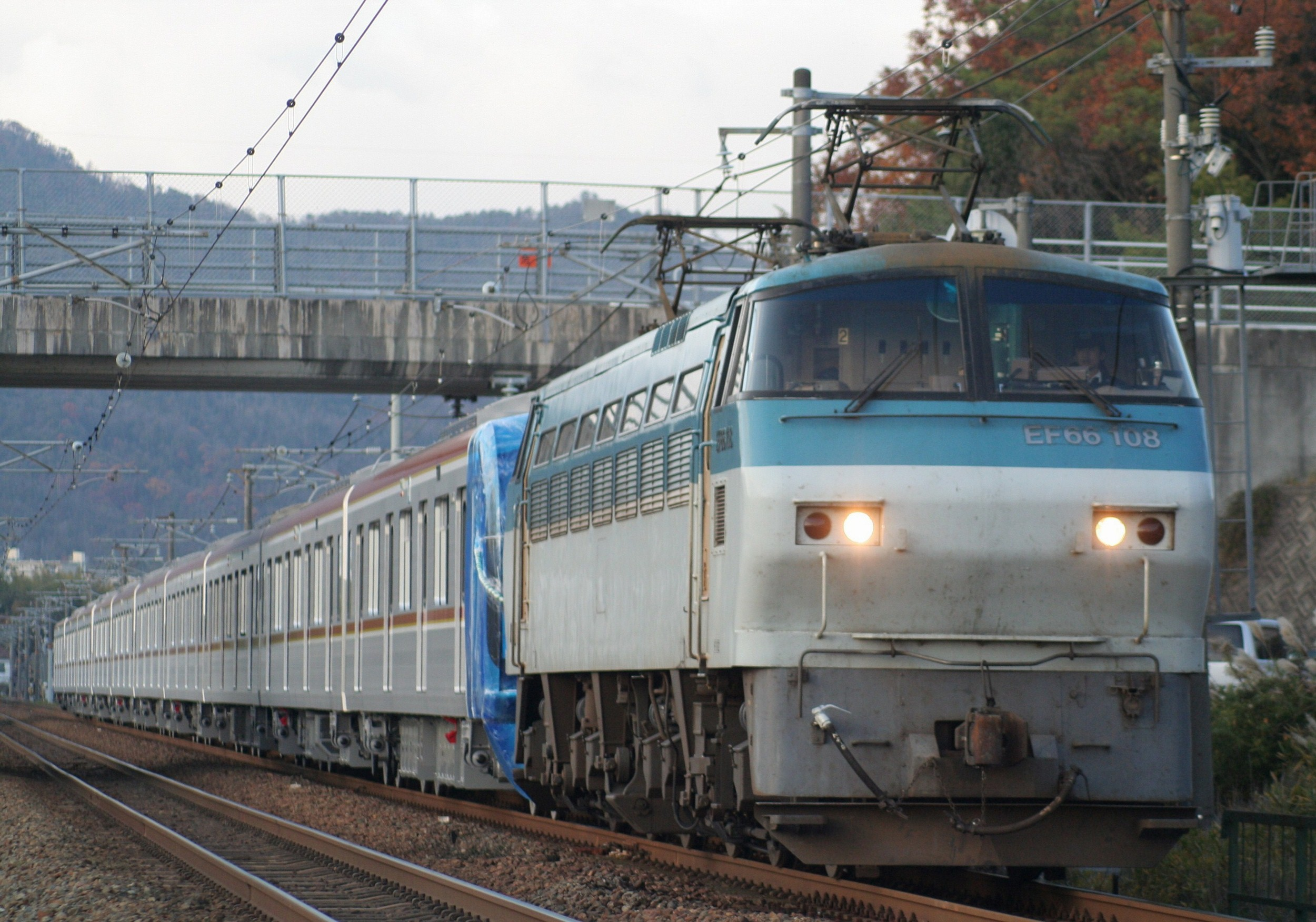
First-batch EF66 108 in December 2009

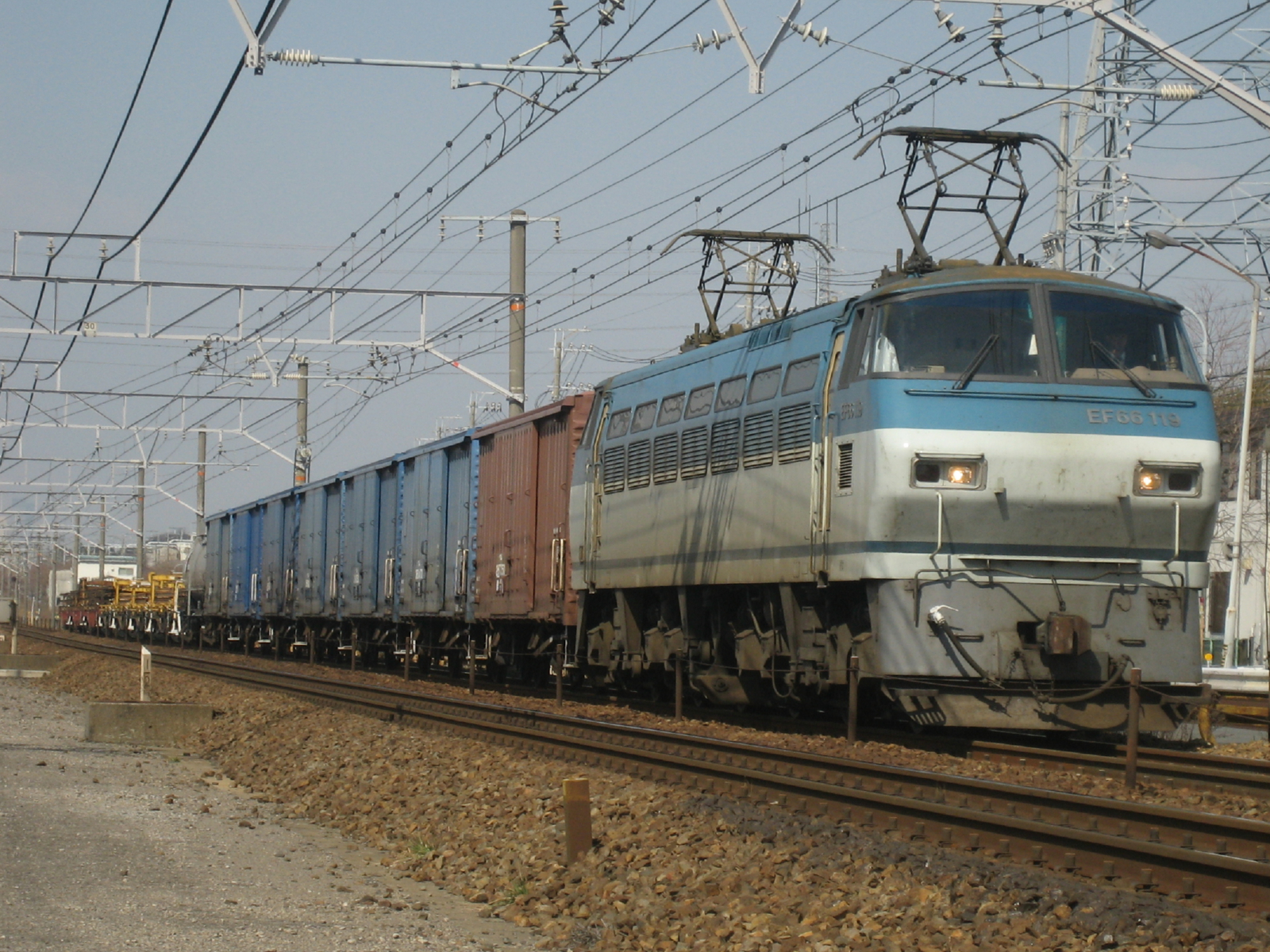
Second-batch Class EF66-119 in February 2007

== Build histories ==
The individual locomotive build histories are as follows.

No.	Manufacturer	Date delivered
EF66-900
EF66 901 (Note: Originally built as EF90 1. Renumbered EF66 901 in August 1968.)	Kawasaki Sharyo/Kawasaki Electric	September 1966
EF66-0
EF66 1	Kisha Seizo/Toyo Electric	July 1968
EF66 2	Kisha Seizo/Toyo Electric	August 1968
EF66 3	Kisha Seizo/Toyo Electric	August 1968
EF66 4	Kisha Seizo/Toyo Electric	September 1968
EF66 5	Kisha Seizo/Toyo Electric	September 1968
EF66 6	Kisha Seizo/Toyo Electric	September 1968
EF66 7	Kawasaki Sharyo/Kawasaki Electric	July 1968
EF66 8	Kawasaki Sharyo/Kawasaki Electric	July 1968
EF66 9	Kawasaki Sharyo/Kawasaki Electric	July 1968
EF66 10	Kawasaki Sharyo/Kawasaki Electric	August 1968
EF66 11	Kawasaki Sharyo/Kawasaki Electric	August 1968
EF66 12	Kawasaki Sharyo/Kawasaki Electric	August 1968
EF66 13	Kawasaki Sharyo/Kawasaki Electric	August 1968
EF66 14	Kisha Seizo/Toyo Electric	October 1968
EF66 15	Kawasaki Heavy Industries/Fuji Electric	September 1968
EF66 16	Kawasaki Heavy Industries/Fuji Electric	April 1969
EF66 17	Kawasaki Heavy Industries/Fuji Electric	May 1969
EF66 18	Kawasaki Heavy Industries/Fuji Electric	September 1969
EF66 19	Kawasaki Heavy Industries/Fuji Electric	September 1969
EF66 20	Kawasaki Heavy Industries/Fuji Electric	September 1969
EF66 21	Kawasaki Heavy Industries/Toyo Electric	August 1973
EF66 22	Kawasaki Heavy Industries/Toyo Electric	August 1973
EF66 23	Kawasaki Heavy Industries/Toyo Electric	September 1973
EF66 24	Kawasaki Heavy Industries/Toyo Electric	September 1973
EF66 25	Kawasaki Heavy Industries/Toyo Electric	October 1973
EF66 26	Kawasaki Heavy Industries/Fuji Electric	August 1973
EF66 27	Kawasaki Heavy Industries/Fuji Electric	August 1973
EF66 28	Kawasaki Heavy Industries/Fuji Electric	August 1973
EF66 29	Kawasaki Heavy Industries/Fuji Electric	September 1973
EF66 30	Kawasaki Heavy Industries/Fuji Electric	September 1973
EF66 31	Kawasaki Heavy Industries/Fuji Electric	September 1973
EF66 32	Kawasaki Heavy Industries/Toyo Electric	March 1974
EF66 33	Kawasaki Heavy Industries/Toyo Electric	March 1974
EF66 34	Kawasaki Heavy Industries/Toyo Electric	September 1974
EF66 35	Kawasaki Heavy Industries/Toyo Electric	September 1974
EF66 36	Kawasaki Heavy Industries/Toyo Electric	September 1974
EF66 37	Kawasaki Heavy Industries/Toyo Electric	October 1974
EF66 38	Kawasaki Heavy Industries/Toyo Electric	October 1974
EF66 39	Kawasaki Heavy Industries/Toyo Electric	November 1974
EF66 40	Kawasaki Heavy Industries/Toyo Electric	January 1975
EF66 41	Kawasaki Heavy Industries/Toyo Electric	January 1975
EF66 42	Kawasaki Heavy Industries/Toyo Electric	February 1975
EF66 43	Kawasaki Heavy Industries/Toyo Electric	February 1975
EF66 44	Kawasaki Heavy Industries/Toyo Electric	February 1975
EF66 45	Kawasaki Heavy Industries/Fuji Electric	August 1974
EF66 46	Kawasaki Heavy Industries/Fuji Electric	August 1974
EF66 47	Kawasaki Heavy Industries/Fuji Electric	August 1974
EF66 48	Kawasaki Heavy Industries/Fuji Electric	September 1974
EF66 49	Kawasaki Heavy Industries/Fuji Electric	September 1974
EF66 50	Kawasaki Heavy Industries/Fuji Electric	October 1974
EF66 51	Kawasaki Heavy Industries/Fuji Electric	January 1975
EF66 52	Kawasaki Heavy Industries/Fuji Electric	January 1975
EF66 53	Kawasaki Heavy Industries/Fuji Electric	January 1975
EF66 54	Kawasaki Heavy Industries/Fuji Electric	February 1975
EF66 55	Kawasaki Heavy Industries/Fuji Electric	February 1975
EF66-100
EF66 101	Kawasaki Heavy Industries/Toyo Electric	16 February 1989
EF66 102	Kawasaki Heavy Industries/Fuji Electric	25 February 1989
EF66 103	Kawasaki Heavy Industries/Toyo Electric	5 March 1989
EF66 104	Kawasaki Heavy Industries/Fuji Electric	9 March 1989
EF66 105	Kawasaki Heavy Industries/Toyo Electric	13 March 1989
EF66 106	Kawasaki Heavy Industries/Fuji Electric	20 March 1989
EF66 107	Kawasaki Heavy Industries/Toyo Electric	28 March 1989
EF66 108	Kawasaki Heavy Industries/Fuji Electric	31 March 1989
EF66 109	Kawasaki Heavy Industries/Fuji Electric	30 January 1990
EF66 110	Kawasaki Heavy Industries/Toyo Electric	6 February 1990
EF66 111	Kawasaki Heavy Industries/Fuji Electric	12 February 1990
EF66 112	Kawasaki Heavy Industries/Toyo Electric	16 February 1990
EF66 113	Kawasaki Heavy Industries/Fuji Electric	22 February 1990
EF66 114	Kawasaki Heavy Industries/Toyo Electric	2 March 1990
EF66 115	Kawasaki Heavy Industries/Fuji Electric	9 March 1990
EF66 116	Kawasaki Heavy Industries/Toyo Electric	16 March 1990
EF66 117	Kawasaki Heavy Industries/Fuji Electric	29 August 1990
EF66 118	Kawasaki Heavy Industries/Toyo Electric	12 September 1990
EF66 119	Kawasaki Heavy Industries/Fuji Electric	20 September 1990
EF66 120	Kawasaki Heavy Industries/Toyo Electric	28 September 1990
EF66 121	Kawasaki Heavy Industries/Fuji Electric	18 October 1990
EF66 122	Kawasaki Heavy Industries/Toyo Electric	30 October 1990
EF66 123	Kawasaki Heavy Industries/Fuji Electric	13 November 1990
EF66 124	Kawasaki Heavy Industries/Toyo Electric	25 February 1991
EF66 125	Kawasaki Heavy Industries/Fuji Electric	28 February 1991
EF66 126	Kawasaki Heavy Industries/Toyo Electric	8 March 1991
EF66 127	Kawasaki Heavy Industries/Fuji Electric	15 March 1991
EF66 128	Kawasaki Heavy Industries/Toyo Electric	25 March 1991
EF66 129	Kawasaki Heavy Industries/Fuji Electric	13 September 1991
EF66 130	Kawasaki Heavy Industries/Toyo Electric	28 September 1991
EF66 131	Kawasaki Heavy Industries/Fuji Electric	22 September 1991
EF66 132	Kawasaki Heavy Industries/Toyo Electric	24 October 1991
EF66 133	Kawasaki Heavy Industries/Fuji Electric	26 September 1991

== Preserved examples ==
- EF66 1: Stored at Hiroshima Depot in Hiroshima.
- EF66 11: Preserved at The Railway Museum in Saitama.
- EF66 35: Preserved at the Kyoto Railway Museum in Kyoto.
- EF66 45: (No. 1 end cab section) Preserved at a museum located next to Torokko Saga Station in Kyoto.
- EF66 45: (No. 2 end cab section) Preserved outside the Hoshiai Eye Clinic in Midori-ku, Saitama, Saitama Prefecture.
- EF66 49: (No. 1 end cab section) Preserved at a museum located next to Torokko Saga Station in Kyoto.
- EF66 49: (No. 2 end cab section) Preserved at the Pain Aux Seigle bakery in Kizugawa, Kyoto, located near Kizu Station.
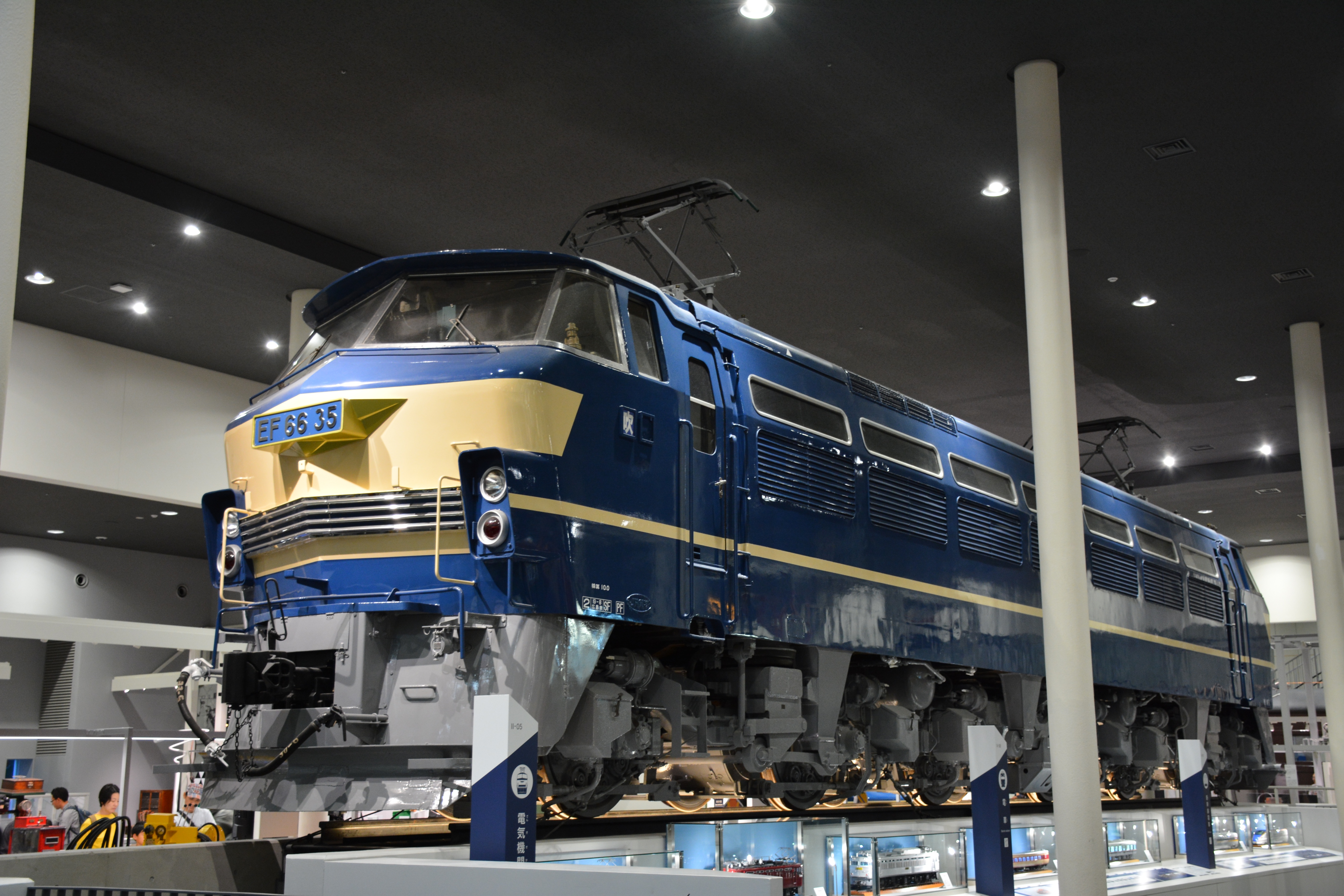
EF66 35 at the Kyoto Railway Museum in October 2016

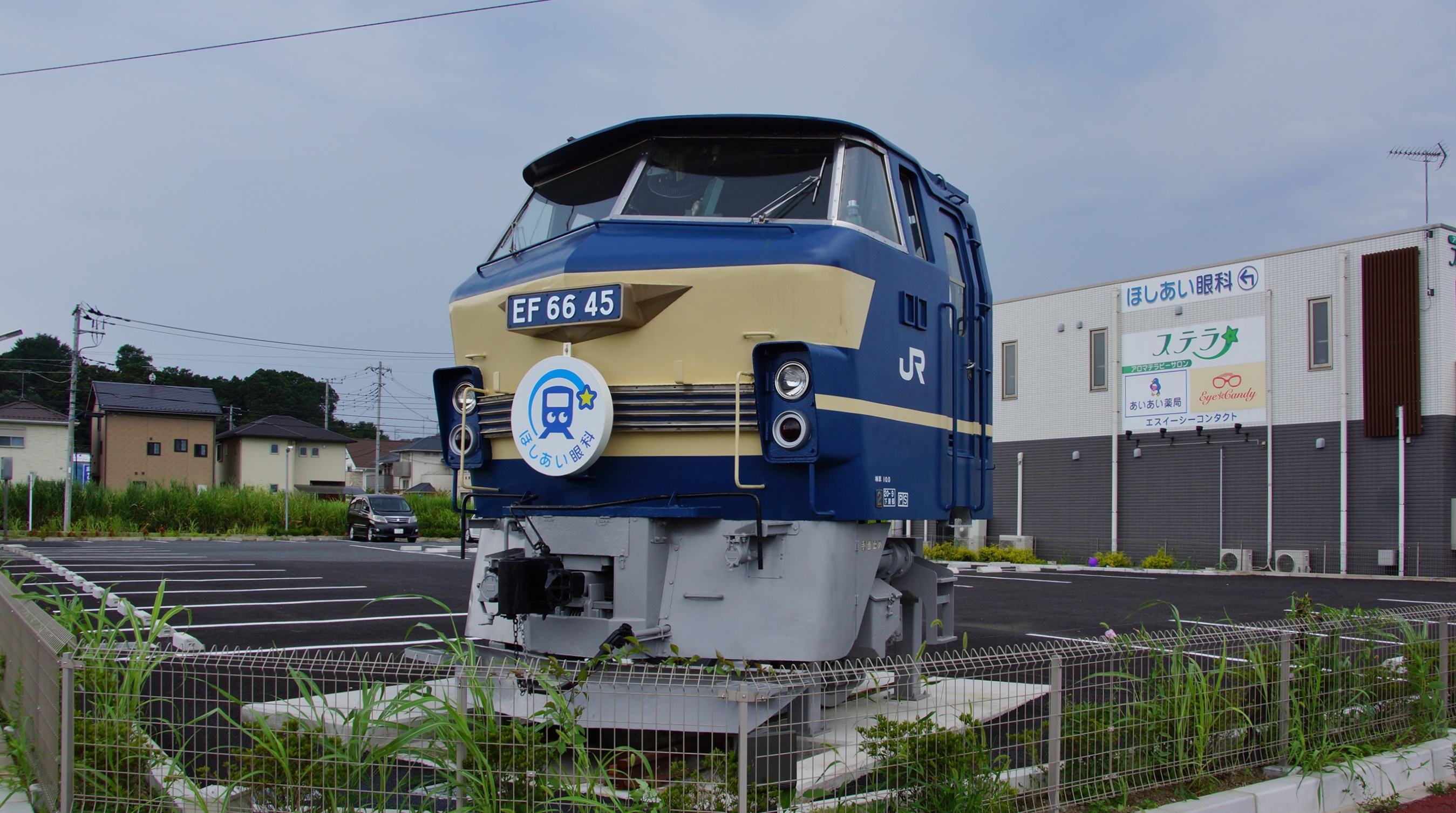
The cab end of EF66 45 in Saitama in July 2014

== See also ==
- Japan Railways locomotive numbering and classification
- RENFE Class 251, an electric locomotive type operated by Renfe in Spain based on the EF66
