= No.251-class auxiliary submarine chaser =

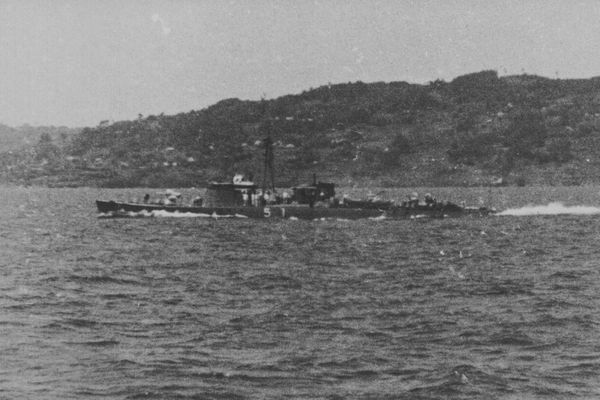
- Auxiliary Submarine Chaser No.251 in 1938

Class overview
- Name: No.251-class aux. submarine chasers; No.251-class (Project number K5A); No.253-class (Project number K5B)
- Builders: Nihon Kōkan Corporation; Ōsaka Iron Works
- Operators: Imperial Japanese Navy
- Built: 1936 – 1939
- In commission: 1937 – 1945
- Planned: 3
- Completed: 3
- Retired: 3
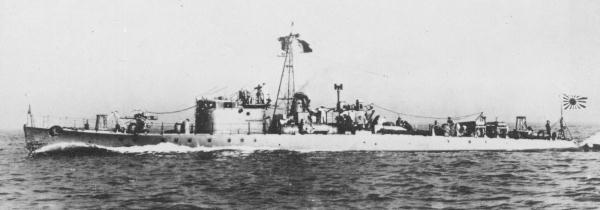
- Auxiliary Submarine Chaser No.253 in 1937

General characteristics
- Type: Submarine chaser
- Displacement: 170 long tons (173 t) standard
- Length: 45.0 m (147 ft 8 in) overall
- Beam: 4.80 m (15 ft 9 in)
- Draught: No.251 and No.252; 1.70 m (5 ft 7 in); No.253; 1.73 m (5 ft 8 in)
- Propulsion: No.251; 2 × original MAN Mk.1 diesels; 2 shafts, 3,000 bhp; No.252; 2 × copied MAN Mk.1 diesels; 2 shafts; No.253; 1 × Kampon geared turbine; 2 × Kampon water tube boilers; 2 shafts, 3,000 shp
- Speed: 23.0 knots (26.5 mph; 42.6 km/h)
- Range: 800 nmi (1,500 km) at 14 kn (16 mph; 26 km/h)
- Complement: 41
- Armament: 1 × 40 mm heavy machine gun; 18 × Type 95 depth charges; 2 × Type 94 depth charge projectors; 1 × depth charge rack; 1 × Type 93 active sonar; 1 × Type 93 hydrophone

The No.251 class auxiliary submarine chaser (第二百五十一号型駆潜特務艇,, Dai 251 Gō-gata Kusen-Tokumutei) was a class of submarine chasers of the Imperial Japanese Navy (IJN), serving during World War II. 3 vessels were built in 1936 – 1939 under the Maru 2 Programme. They have two subclasses, this article handles them collectively.

== Background ==
- In 1934, the IJN planned an experimental model of a high-speed coast defense submarine chaser. The IJN wanted over 20 kn (23 mph; 37 km/h), however the Navy Technical Department (Kampon) had not designed this type of small craft and the needed high-powered diesel engines yet.
- The IJN ordered the hull design from Thornycroft, and the high-powered diesel design from MAN, to study a small-sized high-speed boat.

== Design ==
- The Thornycroft drawings were not able to satisfy the IJN, because the design's center of gravity was too high, and had bad drainage. Kampon made a hull design based on the Hayabusa class torpedo boat instead.
- The IJN was satisfied with MAN diesel specifications, however their designs were very complicated and very expensive. The IJN bought two engines and labeled them MAN Mk.1 diesel (マ式1号ディーゼル,, Ma-Shiki 1 Gō diesel). Further, the IJN ordered copies of these engines from Kawasaki Heavy Industries and Mitsubishi Heavy Industries.
- Also, 1 vessel was equipped with a Kampon turbine, because the MAN diesel engines were unsuitable for a mass production.

== Service ==
- The IJN deployed them to a mine warfare school after having finished their examination, because they were too small.
- They became a training ship of the mine warfare school, and they acted in Tokyo Bay.

== Ships in classes ==
=== No.251-class ===
- Project number K5A. 2 vessels were completed. They were equipped with MAN design diesels. The No.252 was equipped the copied MAN diesels by Kawasaki and Mitsubishi.

==== No.251 ====
- 14 December 1936: Laid down as the Submarine Chaser No.51 (第51号駆潜艇,, Dai 51 Gō Kusentei) at Nihon Kōkan, Tsurumi Shipyard.
- 9 June 1937: Launched.
- 30 September 1937: Completed.
- 15 November 1940: Classified to the Auxiliary submarine chaser, and renamed Auxiliary Submarine Chaser No.51 (第51号駆潜特務艇,, Dai 51 Gō Kusen-Tokumutei).
- (after): Assigned to the mine warfare school (Kurihama).
- 30 April 1943: Renamed Auxiliary Submarine Chaser No.251 (第251号駆潜特務艇,, Dai 251 Gō Kusen-Tokumutei).
- 28 August 1944: Classified to the Support vessel (tugboat), and renamed No.1658 (公称第1658号,, Kōshō-Dai 1658 Gō).
- August 1945: The end of war at Uraga, later nothing more was heard.

==== No.252 ====
- 14 December 1936: Laid down as the Submarine Chaser No.52 (第52号駆潜艇,, Dai 52 Gō Kusentei) at Nihon Kōkan, Tsurumi Shipyard.
- 25 August 1937: Launched.
- 25 July 1939: Completed.
- 15 November 1940: Classified to the Auxiliary submarine chaser, and renamed Auxiliary Submarine Chaser No.52 (第52号駆潜特務艇,, Dai 52 Gō Kusen-Tokumutei).
- (after): Assigned to the mine warfare school (Kurihama).
- 30 April 1943: Renamed Auxiliary Submarine Chaser No.252 (第252号駆潜特務艇,, Dai 252 Gō Kusen-Tokumutei).
- 15 February 1944: Classified to the Support vessel (tugboat), and renamed No.1650 (公称第1650号,, Kōshō-Dai 1650 Gō).
- August 1945: The end of war at Uraga, later nothing more was heard.

=== No.253-class ===
- Project number K5B. 1 vessels was completed. She was equipped with Kampon turbine. She was classed in the No.251-class in the IJN official documents.

==== No.253 ====
- 9 January 1937: Laid down as the Submarine Chaser No.53 (第53号駆潜艇,, Dai 53 Gō Kusentei) at Ōsaka Iron Works, Sakurajima Factory.
- 15 July 1937: Launched.
- 31 October 1937: Completed.
- 15 November 1940: Classified to the Auxiliary submarine chaser, and renamed Auxiliary Submarine Chaser No.53 (第53号駆潜特務艇,, Dai 53 Gō Kusen-Tokumutei).
- (after): Assigned to the mine warfare school (Kurihama).
- 30 April 1943: Renamed Auxiliary Submarine Chaser No.253 (第253号駆潜特務艇,, Dai 253 Gō Kusen-Tokumutei).
- 15 February 1944: Classified to the Support vessel (tugboat), and renamed No.1651 (公称第1651号,, Kōshō-Dai 1651 Gō).
- August 1945: The end of war at Uraga.
- August 1946: Sink by unknown effect.

== Bibliography ==
- Ships of the World special issue Vol.45, Escort Vessels of the Imperial Japanese Navy, "Kaijinsha"., (Japan), February 1996
- The Maru Special, Japanese Naval Vessels No.49, Japanese submarine chasers and patrol boats, "Ushio Shobō". (Japan), March 1981
