= Renfe Class 251 =

Spanish electric locomotive class

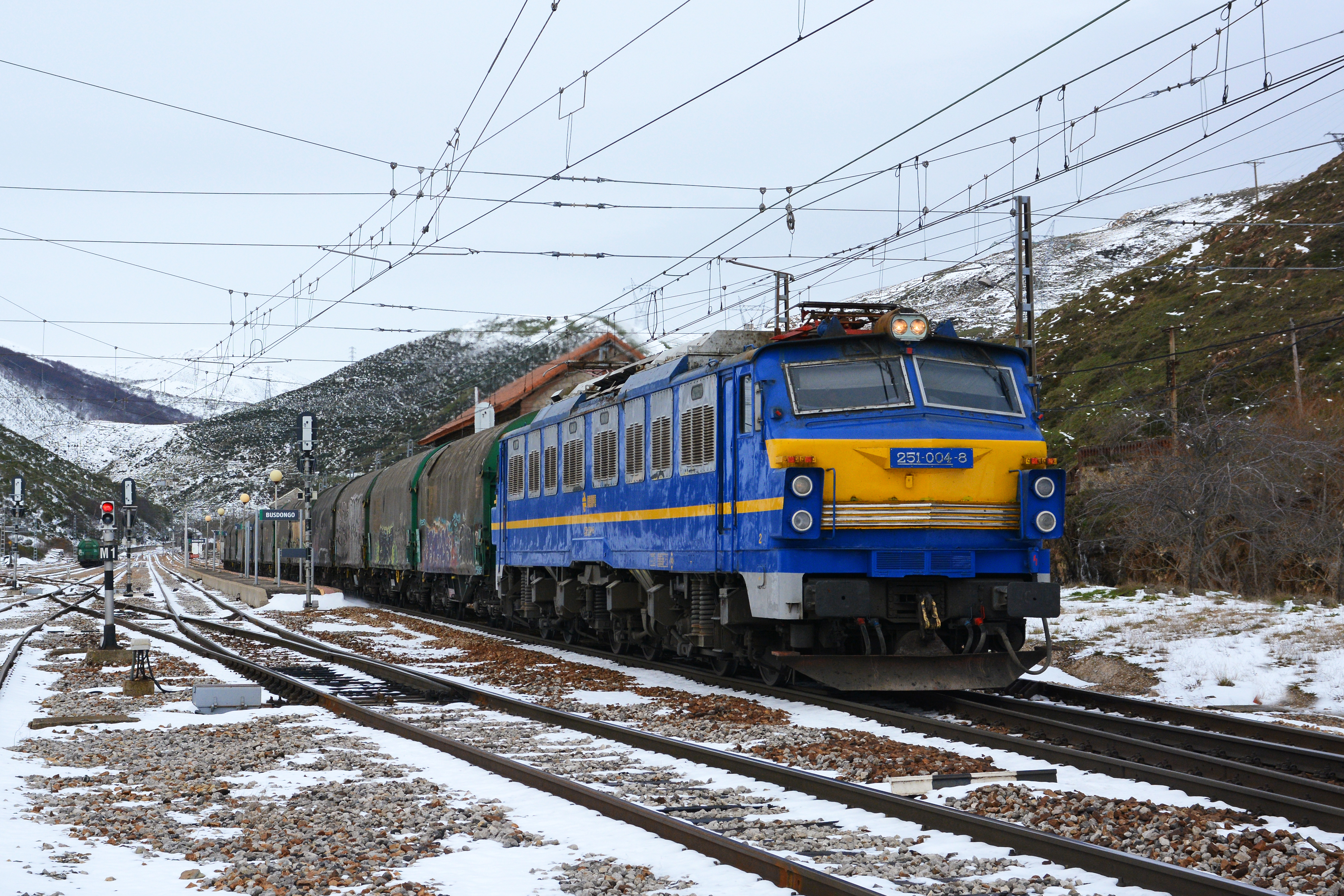
- A Class 251 hauling a freight train in January 2016
Type and origin
- Power type: Electric
- Builder: Mitsubishi Heavy Industries, CAF, MACOSA; Electrical equipment: Mitsubishi Electric, Westinghouse
- Build date: 1982
- Total produced: 30
Specifications
- Configuration
  - AAR: B-B-B
- Gauge: 1,668 mm (5 ft 5 21/32 in)
- Length: 20.7 m (67 ft 11 in)
- Width: 3.19 m (10 ft 6 in)
- Height: 4.28 m (14 ft 1 in)
- Loco weight: 138 t
- Electric system/s: 3000 V DC overhead catenary
- Current pickup: Pantograph
Performance figures
- Maximum speed: 100 km/h (60 mph); 160 km/h (100 mph)
- Power output: 4,650 kW (6,236 hp)
Career
- Operators: Renfe
- Class: Serie 251 de Renfe
- Numbers: 251.001–251.030
- Disposition: Spain

The Renfe Class 251 is a class of electric locomotives operated by Renfe in Spain. They are aesthetically and conceptually based on the JNR Class EF66 operated in Japan, but they have many differences in mechanical design and power output, as well as manufacturers.

== Technical specifications ==
The locomotives have a B-B-B wheel arrangement, and are equipped with monomotor bogies, which have switchable gear ratios. Their maximum axle load is 23 tonnes.

== History ==
The locomotives were introduced in 1982. A total of 30 locomotives have been built. They are mainly used on freight services.

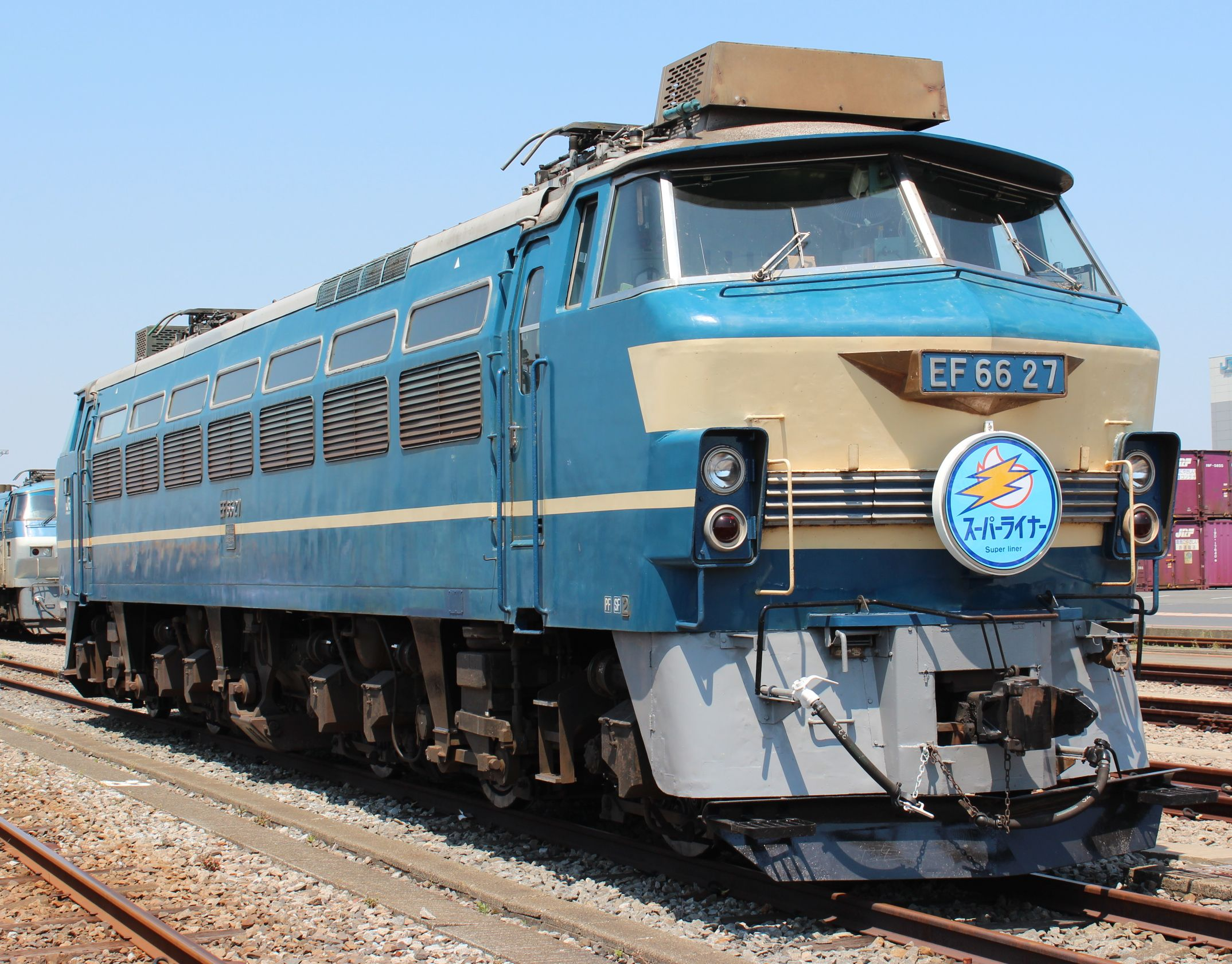
Japanese Class EF66, from which the Class 251 is derived

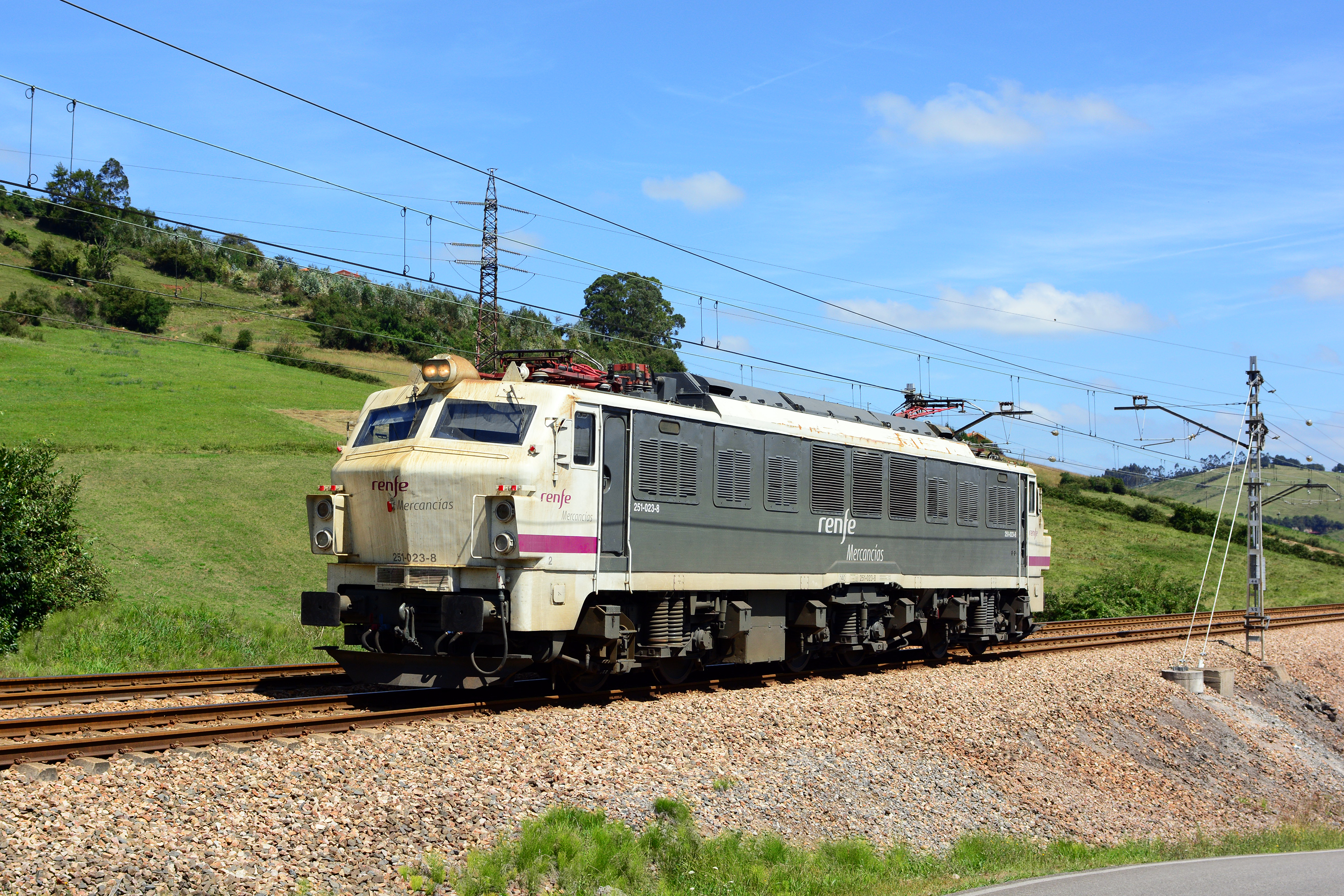
251 023 in Renfe Mercancías livery in August 2017
