= USS Amberjack (SS-219) =

Submarine

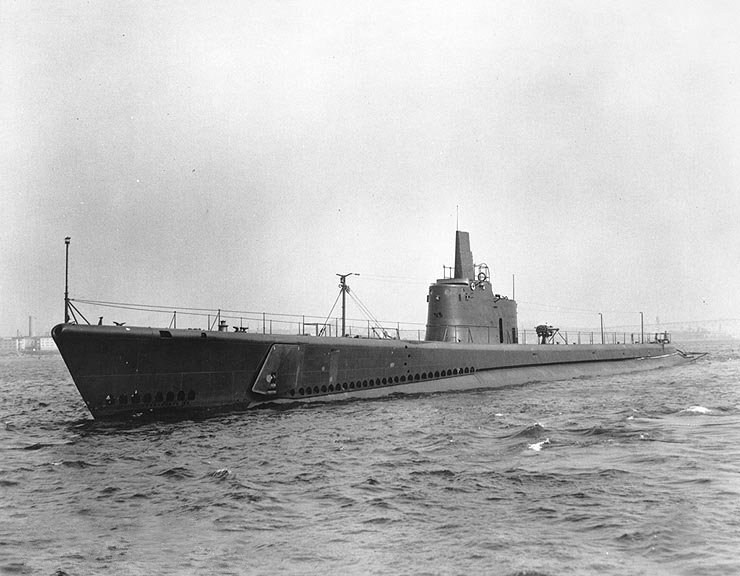
- USS Amberjack in the Thames River off Groton, Connecticut, on 30 May 1942.

History

United States
- Builder: General Dynamics Electric Boat, Groton, Connecticut
- Laid down: 15 May 1941
- Launched: 6 March 1942
- Sponsored by: Mrs. Randall Jacobs
- Commissioned: 19 June 1942
- Fate: Missing, presumed sunk by Japanese torpedo boat Hiyodori and SC-18 off Rabaul, 16 February 1943

General characteristics
- Class & type: Gato-class diesel-electric submarine
- Displacement: 1,525 long tons (1,549 t) surfaced, 2,424 long tons (2,463 t) submerged
- Length: 311 ft 9 in (95.02 m)
- Beam: 27 ft 3 in (8.31 m)
- Draft: 17 ft (5.2 m) maximum
- Propulsion: 4 × General Motors Model 16-248 V16 Diesel engines driving electric generators; 2 × 126-cell Sargo batteries; 4 × high-speed General Electric electric motors with reduction gears; two propellers; 5,400 shp (4.0 MW) surfaced; 2,740 shp (2.0 MW) submerged
- Speed: 21 kn (39 km/h) surfaced, 9 kn (17 km/h) submerged
- Range: 11,000 nmi (20,000 km) surfaced at 10 kn (19 km/h)
- Endurance: 48 hours at 2 kn (3.7 km/h) submerged, 75 days on patrol
- Test depth: 300 ft (91 m)
- Complement: 6 officers, 54 enlisted
- Armament: 10 × 21-inch (533 mm) torpedo tubes; 6 forward, 4 aft; 24 torpedoes; 1 × 3-inch (76 mm) / 50 caliber deck gun; Bofors 40 mm and Oerlikon 20 mm cannon

USS Amberjack (SS-219) was a Gato-class submarine, the first United States Navy ship named for the amberjack.

== Construction and commissioning ==
Amberjack′s keel was laid by the Electric Boat Company of Groton, Connecticut, on 15 May 1941. She was launched on 6 March 1942 (sponsored by Mrs. Randall Jacobs), and commissioned on 19 June 1942.

== Service history ==
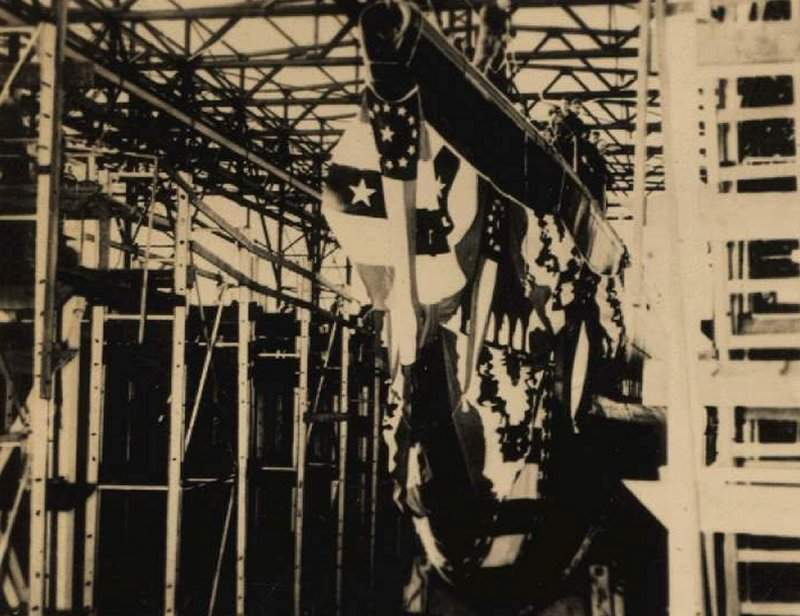
The Amberjack (SS-219) in bunting at her launching at the Electric Boat Co., Groton, CT., 6 March 1942.

After shakedown training in waters off New London, Connecticut and Newport, Rhode Island, Amberjack got underway on 20 July, bound for the Pacific. She transited the Panama Canal in mid-August and reached Pearl Harbor on 20 August. Following training exercises, Amberjack got underway for her first war patrol on 3 September. Two days later, she touched at Johnston Island to refuel and, later that day, resumed her voyage to her patrol area between the northeast coast of New Ireland and Bougainville, Solomon Islands.

On 15 September, Amberjack was patrolling off Kavieng, New Ireland. Three days later, she made contact with a large Japanese transport escorted by a destroyer, and fired a spread of four torpedoes at the vessels, but none hit. While patrolling in Bougainville Strait on 19 September, the submarine launched two torpedoes at an enemy freighter. The first hit under the target's bridge, and the second broke her keel in two. Amberjack was credited with having sunk Shirogane Maru.

Amberjack made her next contact with Japanese shipping on 25 September, spotting a large cruiser escorted by a destroyer. However, before the submarine could get into position for an attack, the destroyer headed toward her and forced her to go deep. Several depth charges were dropped on the submarine, but they inflicted no damage. During the next few days, Amberjack reconnoitered Taʻū, Kilinailau, Kapingamarangi, and Ocean Island.

The submarine spotted a Japanese cruiser on the morning of 30 September and launched four torpedoes from her bow tubes. None hit, so she fired another two forward tubes shortly thereafter. These also went wide of the mark, and the cruiser escaped damage. One week later, the submarine was patrolling off Kavieng when she spotted smoke on the horizon. After a Japanese cargo ship sailed into view, Amberjack launched two torpedoes. One missed forward and the other hit the target's hull forward. The enemy ship was still able to continue under her own power and Amberjack took up the pursuit. About one hour later, both sides opened fire with their deck guns but neither was within the range of the other and they broke off the fire. After two more hours of the chase, the submarine fired a slow speed torpedo which hit its target five minutes later. The cargo vessel, later identified as Senkai Maru, swung left and seemed to stop. Its bow swung up in the air, the ship took a vertical position, and sank from sight shortly thereafter. Lifeboats carrying the cargo ship's survivors were later spotted as the submarine headed for Kavieng.

While patrolling off Kavieng Harbor on 10 October, Amberjack spotted Japanese ships in the harbor and launched four torpedoes into the anchorage. One damaged a freighter and another damaged Tonan Maru II, (19,262 tons) which was being used to ferry airplanes. The vessel sank in shallow water, but was later salvaged, towed to Japan for repairs, and was returned to service. On 16 October, the submarine headed for Espiritu Santo for repairs to her ballast tanks and arrived there on 19 October. While undergoing repairs, she was assigned the task of hauling aviation gas, bombs, and personnel to Guadalcanal. While en route to the Solomons, her destination was changed to Tulagi. She arrived there on 25 October and unloaded her embarked troops and cargo under the cover of darkness. The next day, she set course for Brisbane, Australia, and reached that port on 30 October.

After a refit alongside Griffin and a series of training exercises, Amberjack began her second war patrol on 21 November. On the morning of 27 November, the submarine encountered two enemy destroyers which were probably carrying supplies for Japanese forces on Guadalcanal. While launching four torpedoes from her stern tubes, the submarine heard the screws of a third ship crossing ahead of her bow. None of the torpedoes hit their target, and the submarine began to take action to avoid depth charges. Approximately two hours later, all sounds had faded away, and the submarine rose to the surface to look for signs of damage. She spotted nothing so she assumed a new station at the southern end of the eastern entrance to Shortland Harbor.

On 29 November, while on patrol ten miles (16 km) east of the Treasury Islands, Amberjack spotted a surfaced Japanese submarine. Before she could set up an attack, however, the enemy vessel rapidly drew away. She again saw a Japanese submarine on 3 December proceeding toward the entrance to Shortland harbor and sent four torpedoes toward the fleeing enemy, but all failed to hit. During the next one and one-half weeks, she made numerous ship contacts but carried out no attacks. On 15 December, the submarine sighted a convoy consisting of four or five ships on a course for Rabaul and launched two torpedoes at a large freighter, one at a small tanker, and one more at a small freighter. However, she apparently inflicted no damage on any of the targets.

Her next contact occurred on 20 December. While patrolling submerged, Amberjack began hearing a series of explosions which drew closer and closer. She surfaced and saw two Japanese destroyer escorts, which soon thereafter began raining depth charges on the submarine. Within the space of one minute, six exploded close aboard, shook the vessel considerably, and caused numerous broken light bulbs forward. Some fittings mounted on the overhead were broken off, and several valves were sprung open. However, the submarine suffered no crippling damage and moved on to continue her patrol off the northeast coast of New Ireland.

She spotted another Japanese ship on 3 January 1943, a destroyer which apparently was waiting to rendezvous with a convoy from the Palau Islands. The submarine was unable to attack the ship and, two days later, set a course for Brisbane, Queensland. She reached that port on 11 January and safely concluded her patrol.

Following this patrol, the submarine's period of the refit was cut to 12 days due to the urgent need for submarines to patrol enemy-infested waters. She got underway on 24 January but was forced to return to Brisbane for repair of minor leaks which developed during a deep dive. Again departing Brisbane on 26 January, Amberjack started her third war patrol in the Solomons area. On 29 January she was directed to pass close to Tetipari Island and then proceed to the northwest and patrol the approaches to Shortland Basin. Orders were radioed on 1 February for her to move north and patrol the western approaches to Buka Passage. Having complied with these orders, Amberjack made her first miles southeast of Treasury Island on 1 February, and of sinking a two-masted schooner by gunfire 20 miles (32 km) from Buka the afternoon of 3 February 1943. At this time she was ordered to move south along the Buka-Shortland traffic lane and patrol east of Vella Lavella Island.

In a second radio transmission on 4 February, Amberjack reported having sunk a 5,000-ton freighter laden with explosives in a two-hour night surface attack that date in which five torpedoes were fired. During this engagement, an officer was slightly wounded in the hand by machine gun fire. Chief Pharmacist's Mate Arthur C. Beeman, went to the bridge to assist the officer and was killed by machine gun fire. On 8 February, Amberjack was ordered to move to the west side of Ganongga Island and on 10 February, she was directed to keep south of latitude 7°30'S and to cover the traffic routes from Rabaul and Buka Island to Shortland Basin. On 13 February, Amberjack was assigned the entire Rabaul-Buka-Shortland Sea area and told to hunt for traffic.

The last radio transmission received from Amberjack was made on 14 February. She related having been forced down the night before by two destroyers, and that she had recovered from the water and taken prisoner an enemy aviator on 13 February. She was ordered north of latitude 6°30'S, and told to keep hunting for Rabaul traffic.

All further messages to Amberjack remained unanswered, and when, by 10 March, she had failed to make her routine report estimating the time of her arrival at base, she was ordered to do so. No reply was received, and she was reported as presumed lost on 22 March 1943.

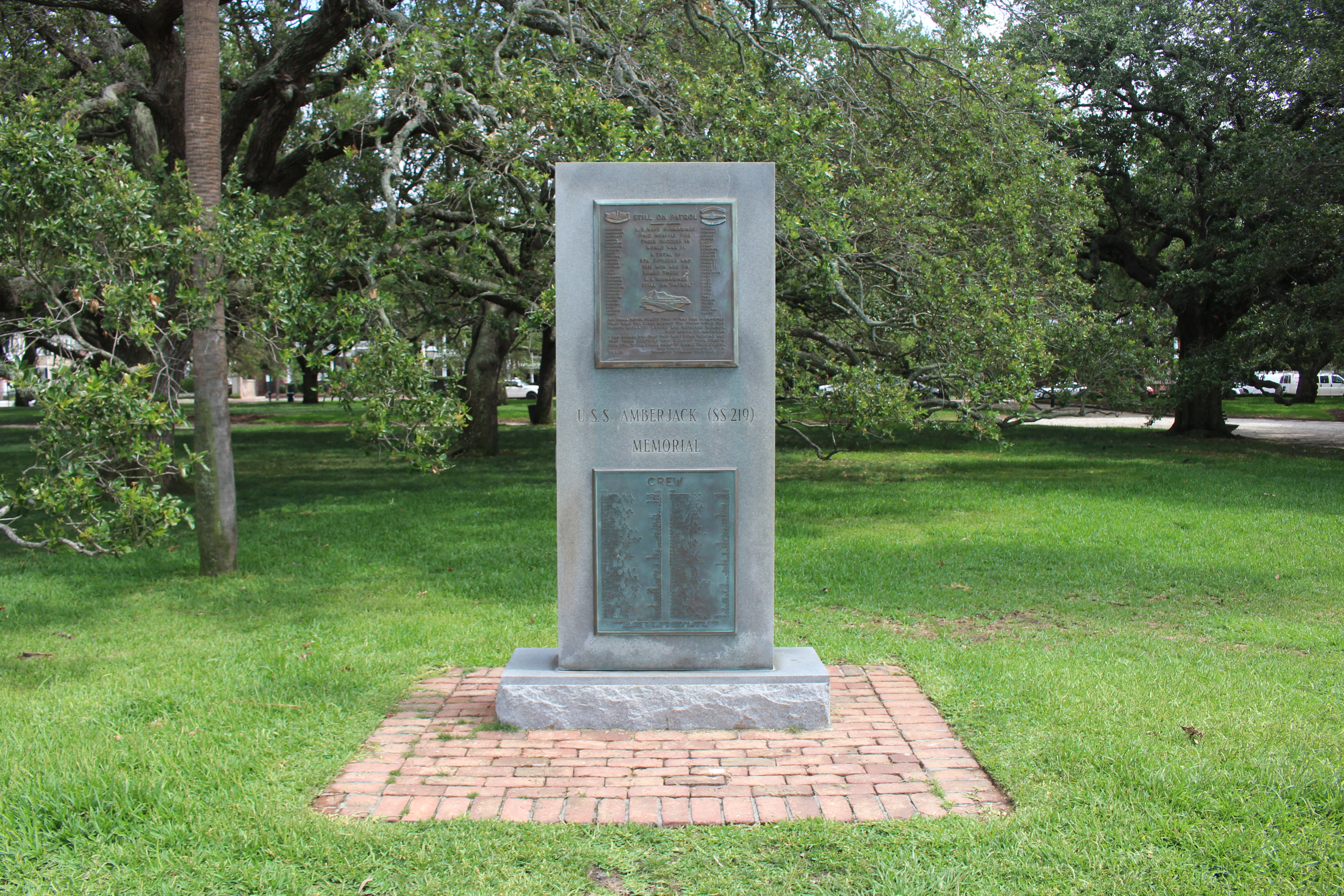
Memorial in Charleston, South Carolina

Reports received from the enemy after the war record an attack which probably sank Amberjack. On 16 February 1943, Japanese torpedo boat Hiyodori and Sub Chaser Number 18 attacked a U.S. submarine with nine depth charges at about 5°05′S 152°37′E. An escorting patrol plane had previously attacked the submarine. A large amount of heavy oil and "parts of the hull" came to the surface. This attack is believed to have sunk Amberjack. However, no final conclusions can be drawn, since Grampus was lost in the same area at about the same time. From the evidence available, it is considered most likely that the attack of 16 February sank Amberjack, but if she did survive this attack, any one of the attacks and sightings thought to have been made on Grampus might have been made on Amberjack.

== Awards ==
- Asiatic-Pacific Campaign Medal with three battle stars for World War II service

Amberjack received credit for sinking three ships totaling of 28,600 tons and damaging two ships totaling 14,000 tons.

== Legacy ==
The enlisted men's recreation center at Submarine Base, Pearl Harbor, is named for Chief Pharmacist's Mate Arthur C. Beeman, who was killed in the gun battle of 4 February 1943.

== In popular culture ==
Amberjack appears in the Harry Turtledove alternate history novel Days of Infamy, surfacing briefly during a deployment around Japanese-occupied Hawaii.
