= Japanese torpedo boat Hiyodori =

History

Empire of Japan
- Name: Hiyodori
- Ordered: 1934 Fiscal Year
- Laid down: 26 November 1934
- Launched: 25 October 1935
- In service: 20 December 1936
- Out of service: 17 November 1944
- Stricken: 10 January 1945
- Fate: Torpedoed and sunk by USS Gunnel

General characteristics
- Class & type: Otori-class torpedo boat
- Displacement: 1936: 840 tonnes standard; 1944: 1,043 tonnes standard
- Length: 85 m (278 ft 10 in) wl; 88.5 m (290 ft 4 in) oa
- Beam: 8.18 m (26 ft 10 in)
- Draft: 2.86 m (9 ft 5 in)
- Propulsion: Two Ro-type Kanpon boilers generating 30 kg/cm^{2} (430 psi); Two Kanpon geared turbines generating 19,000 shp (14,000 kW), Two shafts
- Speed: 30.5 knots (56.5 km/h; 35.1 mph)
- Range: 4,000 nmi (7,400 km; 4,600 mi) at 14 knots (26 km/h; 16 mph)
- Complement: 113
- Armament: 1936: 3 x 12 cm 11th Year Type naval gun, 1 x 53 cm triple torpedo tube, 1 x 40 mm Vickers AA gun, 2 x paravanes; 1944: 2 x 12 cm 11th Year Type naval gun, 1 x 53 cm triple torpedo tube, 3 x 25 mm Type 96 AA Gun in twin mountings, 5 x 25 mm Type 96 AA gun in single mountings, 48 x depth charges

The Japanese torpedo boat Hiyodori was an Otori-class torpedo boat of the Imperial Japanese Navy, built for escort and anti-submarine duties. Although classified as a torpedo boat, she was large enough to be considered a small destroyer or a fast escort. She was the third ship of her class to be completed and served in the Second Sino-Japanese War and the Second World War.

== Design and description ==
Since the Otori class was designed and built with the harsh lessons learned from the Tomozuru and Fourth Fleet incidents, Hiyodori benefited from having both a considerably powerful armament and far greater stability. The stability was provided with a lower bridge level, less armament and protection (in the case of gun shields) and a keel ballast. Upon launch, Hiyodori's armament was the same as that of her sister-ships, distinguished by a set of three torpedo tubes amidships, three 12 cm guns and a single 40 mm Vickers machine gun.

In 1944, Hiyodori and the surviving ships of the Otori class had their aft 12 cm gun and their single 40 mm Vickers gun replaced with several 25 mm anti-aircraft mounted in five single mounts and three twin mounts, granting her a total of 11 machine guns. The paravanes were also replaced with additional depth charges and depth-charge throwers, bringing the total number of depth charges on board to 48, and her standard displacement to 1,043 tonnes.

== Service career ==
Hiyodori was first assigned to the 15th Escort Squadron of the Second China Expeditionary Fleet following its completion on 20 December 1936, and later taking part in the Second Sino-Japanese War.

Hiyodori began the Second World War with the Hong Kong Invasion Force. Following the successful invasion of Hong Kong, Hiyodori patrolled the Chinese coast from December 1941 to August 1942. During this time, the 15th Escort Squadron was deactivated and Hiyodori was transferred under the direct command of the Second Chinese Expeditionary Fleet, with which Hiyodori would spend the rest of the war escorting convoys in the Pacific.

On 16 February 1943, Hiyodori and the submarine chaser No. 18 detected and sank USS Amberjack.

While escorting a convoy from Manila to Brunei in late October 1944, Hiyodori assisted the destroyer Naganami in the inspection of the derelict USS Darter on 24 October 1944.

On 17 November 1944, Hiyodori was sunk by USS Gunnel 140 miles (230 km) east northeast of Cape Tourane.
