= Japan Railway Journal =

Japanese TV program

- Genre: Docuseries
- Directed by: Kunugiyama Mikio
- Presented by: Russell Totten; Takagi Ryo; Nathan Berry; Cathy Cat (2021 - present); Hiro Ueno (2025 - )
- Theme music composer: The C-52's
- Country of origin: Japan
- Original language: English

Production
- Executive producers: Ito Jun; Kojima Nobuo
- Producer: Wako Takehiro
- Cinematography: Muranaka Takeo
- Editor: Murakami Shuichi
- Running time: 30 minutes
- Production company: NHK World-Japan

Original release
- Network: NHK World-Japan TV
- Release: March 8, 2015

Japan Railway Journal is a TV program from NHK World TV documenting rail transport in Japan that started broadcasting on March 8, 2015.

== Overview ==
The program showcases the charm and the cutting-edge technology of rail transport in Japan. New episodes are broadcast 1 to 2 times a month.

At first, many of the talking sections were filmed in a bar with a train diorama, "Bar Ginza Panorama" in Shinjuku. Now, filming these sections on-location at the featured rail facilities is more common.

Due to the COVID-19 pandemic, NHK World has been showing Japan Railway Journal repeats in lieu of new episodes. The combination of studio presentation and on-site reporting makes it difficult for video production. The show returned from the hiatus in May 2021.

== Broadcast times ==
- First broadcast: Fridays 0:30 - 1:00 JST on NHK World TV
- Rebroadcasts:
  - NHK World TV (JST): Fridays 6:30 - 7:00; 12:30 - 13:00; 18:30 - 19:00
  - BS1 (JST): Wednesdays 3:00 - 3:30 (From 2016 - broadcasts may be cancelled due to sports programs)
    - Broadcasts outside Japan will come 5 days after Japan at the earliest, but on weeks with no new programs, older ones will be rebroadcast.

== Presenters ==
- Presenter: Hiro Ueno (2025-)
- Presenter: Miki Clark (2024-)
- Presenter: Cathy Cat (2021-2025)
- Commentators: Takagi Ryo of Kogakuin University (2015-)
- Early episodes also included various female tarento who like railways (see "Guest" column of the episode list)

Previous presenters

- Presenter: Nathan Berry (2018-2020)
- Presenter: Russell Totten (until 2017)
- Assistant: Sarah MacDonald (in 2017)

== Main topics ==
Special Rail Report
Section which features that week's main topic.
Railway Topics
Short segment which features the latest themes in railways.
Hands-on Railway History
Russell Totten visits railway museums in Japan and presents railway history.
Avid Rail Communities
Russell Totten and a female guest showcase a community related to railways in Japan.

== Episode list ==
	NHK World First broadcast date	BS1 First broadcast date	Title	Japanese title	Guest
1	March 8, 2015	March 11, 2015	The Railway Revival: 4 years after the Great Earthquake	大震災から4 よみがえる鉄路	-
2	April 9, 2015	April 18, 2015	The New Shinkansen: Technology and Economic Effects	北陸新幹線 その技術と経済効果	Jessica Claros
3	May 14, 2015	May 11, 2015	Isumi Railway: There's Nothing Here!	いすみ鉄道 ここには、何もないがあります	Charlotte Kate Fox
4	June 12, 2015	May 31, 2015	Diesel Hybrid Trains: Japan's World-Leading Technology	世界をリードする ハイブリッドディーゼル車両	Rei Kitada
5	July 10, 2015	June 7, 2015	Battery Hybrid Trains: Development of the Global Technology	世界が注目! バッテリー電車最前線	Rei Kitada
6	August 14, 2015	July 5, 2015	Japan's Subway Technology in High Density Operation	世界に売れる日本の地下鉄	Rei Kitada
7	October 9, 2015	September 6, 2015	The Secret of Operating Preserved Steam Locomotives	動態保存SLの舞台裏	Rena Matsui
8	November 13, 2015	November 22, 2015	Special Preview - Hokkaido Shinkansen: Hopes and Challenges	ひと足先に見せます 北海道新幹線 期待と課題	Rena Matsui
9	December 4, 2015	June 29, 2015	Yamanote Line: The Green Rotating Heart of Tokyo	東京の顔 “山手線”が変わる	Miki Murai
10	January 15, 2016	August 3, 2016	Seven Stars in Kyushu: The Local Revitalizing Cruise Train	ななつ星in九州	Saya Ichikawa
11	February 12, 2016	August 30, 2016	Second Chances for Used Trains in Southeast Asia	東南アジアで人気! 日本製中古車両	Miki Murai
12	March 11, 2016	April 27, 2016	Earthquake Safety: What 5 Years has Taught Us	震災の教訓を生かせ 鉄道の災害対策最前線	Miki Murai
13	April 8, 2016	April 13, 2016	Superconducting Maglev: The Extreme Speeds of Tomorrow	リニア中央新幹線	Miki Murai
14	April 15, 2016	April 20, 2016	Ekiben: A True Rail Traveling Companion	ニッポンの鉄道の名脇役Ekiben	Atsumi Furuya
15	May 13, 2016	May 18, 2016	Premium Express Shimakaze: A Train of Dreams to Reality	いざ伊勢志摩へ “しまかぜ”成功の秘密	Miki Murai
16	May 20, 2016	May 25, 2016	The Cat Stationmaster Who Rescued a Railway	“たま駅長”の再建物語 ～和歌山電鐵～	Miki Murai
17	June 10, 2016	June 19, 2016	New Generation Express: Journey to Speed and Comfortability	次世代特急 “スーパーあずさ”の実力	Miki Murai
18	June 17, 2016	June 21, 2016	The Future of Rail Freight Transport	内外から注目 見直される鉄道貨物最前線	Miki Murai
19	July 15, 2016	July 20, 2016	Light Rail Vehicles: Modern Trams Reshaping Urban Transit	次世代型路面電車最前線	Naomi Yano
20	July 22, 2016	July 27, 2016	Kyoto Railway Museum: The Story of Rail Transport in Japan	鉄道史が凝縮！ 京都鉄道博物館の魅力	Naomi Yano
21	August 5, 2016	August 24, 2016	Keikyu: The Strive for World-Class Rail Operation	人間主導で安定運行実現 京浜急行電鉄	Miki Murai
22	September 16, 2016	October 4, 2016	World-Class Maintenance: The Backbone of Shinkansen Operations	新幹線を支える メンテナンスの裏側	Naomi Yano
23	October 7, 2016	November 9, 2016	Railways Back on Track: Six Months after the Kumamoto Earthquakes	熊本地震から半 九州の鉄道復旧状況	Naomi Yano
24	October 14, 2016	November 23, 2016	Future Prospects Made in the Past: JR East's Steam Loco Strategy	SL運行に勝算あり! JR東日本の戦略	Momo Itō
25	November 11, 2016	December 11, 2016	Picking Up the Pace: JR Shikoku's Tactics for Survival	生き残りかけた高速化 JR四国経営戦略	Miki Murai
26	December 9, 2016	December 21, 2016	The Seeds of Success: Kyoto's Sagano Scenic Railway	嵯峨野観光鉄道 トロッコ列車成功の秘密	Tomomi Kuno
27	January 13, 2017	February 1, 2017	Turning Problems into Opportunities: The Tsugaru Railway's Strategy	津軽鉄道 危機を救った商社出身社長の戦略	Naomi Yano
28	January 20, 2017	February 8, 2017	Japan's World-Class Rail and Wheels	世界に誇る日本製レールと 車輪の秘密	Miki Murai
29	February 17, 2017	March 1, 2017	Keihan Electric Railway: Advanced Technology that Dominated the Railway Hub	京阪電鉄 鉄道激戦区を制した先進技術	Miki Murai
30	March 10, 2017	March 15, 2017	The Long Winter of Discontent: One Railway's Battle against Snow	雪との闘い JR飯山線の長い冬	Tomomi Kuno
31	April 7, 2017	April 12, 2017	Dreams of a Texas Bullet Train: Future Plans for Japan's High-Speed Railways	テキサス新幹線計画 JR東海の戦略	Sarah MacDonald
32	April 14, 2017	April 19, 2017	Using Railways to Promote Local Tourism: Kyushu Railway Company's Strategy	鉄道は観光資源 JR九州の地域戦略	Sarah MacDonald
33	May 12, 2017	May 17, 2017	Toden Arakawa Line: A Hidden Gem for Tourists from Overseas	訪日外国人に人気! 都電荒川線の魅力	Sarah MacDonald
34	May 19, 2017	June 7, 2017	All the Comfort You Require: Onboard Services on Japanese Trains	進化する鉄道の車内販売	Sarah MacDonald
35	June 16, 2017	July 5, 2017	The Unsung Hero of Japanese Railways: Series Kiha 40 Diesel Trains	日本の鉄道の影の主役 キハ40系気動車	Sarah MacDonald Wakako Miyamoto (reporter)
36	July 14, 2017	August 23, 2017	Airport Express Lines: How Competition is Improving the Ride into the City	成田・関空アクセス鉄道	Sarah MacDonald
37	August 4, 2017	September 20, 2017	Prepaid E-money Cards: The Smart Way to Travel in Japan	世界に誇るICカード乗車券	Sarah MacDonald
38	August 11, 2017	September 27, 2017	HIGH RAIL 1375: The Tourist Train That Touches New Heights	HIGH RAIL 1375の魅力	Sarah MacDonald Wakako Miyamoto (reporter)
39	September 8, 2017	October 4, 2017	Train Suite Shiki-shima: The High-Tech Luxury Cruise Train	トランスイート四季島	Wakako Miyamoto
40	September 15, 2017	October 11, 2017	A Long-Awaited Whistle: Tobu Railway's Steam Service Revival	よみがえった汽笛 東武鉄道SL復活	Yasuna Mizobata
41	October 6, 2017	October 24, 2017	Rediscovering Old Horizons: Preservation and Utilization of Railway Heritage	広がる鉄道遺産の保存と活用	Wakako Miyamoto Miki Murai
42	October 20, 2017	November 8, 2017	Hankyu Corporation: A Leading Private Railway Company's Business Model	鉄道会社経営多角化のモデル 阪急電鉄	Yasuna Mizobata
43	November 17, 2017	December 5, 2017	Advanced Urban Travel: Japan's Monorail Systems	モノレール大国 ニッポンの技術力	Wakako Miyamoto
44	December 15, 2017	January 10, 2018	Safeguarding the System: Maintaining JR Central's Conventional Line	在来線の安全を守る JR東海	Yasuna Mizobata
45	January 12, 2018	January 31, 2018	Driving Forward with Steam: Oigawa Railway's Strategy	SL運行で活路を開く 大井川鐵道の戦略	Miki Clark
46	January 19, 2018	February 7, 2018	Hokuriku Shinkansen Update: Re-assessing the Effects and Challenges 3 Years On	北陸新幹線金沢開業3 効果と課題	Sarah MacDonald
47	February 16, 2018	February 21, 2018	JR OITA CITY: The Station Complex that Changed the Game	駅ビル開発 JRおおいたシティ	Okada Naoka (緒方直加) (NHK Ōita newscaster)
48	March 2, 2018	March 7, 2018	Enoshima Electric Railway: A Good Old 10 km Ride	全線10キロの優良鉄道 江ノ島電鉄	Miki Clark
49	April 6, 2018	April 25, 2018	A New Generation of Commuter Train: Tokyu Corporation's Series 2020	次世代通勤電車 東急2020系新技術	Yasuna Mizobata
50	April 20, 2018	May 9, 2018	The Ultimate in Comfort: New Limited Express Super Azusa	新型“スーパーあずさ”	Miki Clark
51	May 25, 2018	June 13, 2018	Tobu Railway's Revaty Express: Moving Forward to a Better Nikko	新型特急でNikko活性化 東武鉄道	Yasuna Mizobata Miki Clark
52	June 8, 2018	June 27, 2018	Gakunan Electric Train: A New Outlook in the Foothills of Mt. Fuji	富士山と夜景で誘客 岳南電車の挑戦	Izumo Ayano (出雲あや乃) (NHK Shizuoka newscaster)
53	July 13, 2018	August 1, 2018	Kominato Railway: The Strategy of a Quaint Local Railway	里山とレトロで誘客 小湊鐵道の経営戦略	Yasuna Mizobata
54	July 20, 2018	August 8, 2018	The Golden Route to Hakone: Limited Express Romancecar and the Mountain Train	鉄道で行く箱根ゴールデンルート ロマンスカーと登山電車	Yasuna Mizobata
55	July 27, 2018	August 15, 2018	New-Look Railway Museum: A Wonderland of Japan's Railway History	“鉄道博物館” リニューアルオープン	Yasuna Mizobata
56	September 21, 2018	October 16, 2018	Shinano Railway: Managing the Risks of the Next 30 Years	しなの鉄道 30年後を見据えた経営戦略	Yasuna Mizobata
57	September 28, 2018	October 24, 2018	Chartered Tour Trains: Special Times for Special Tours	時刻表にない観光列車 団体専用列車	Yasuna Mizobata
58	October 19, 2018	November 7, 2018	Nagoya Railroad: Advancing with Easy Airport Access and a Famous Castle Town	空港特急と犬山観光でおもてなし 名古屋鉄道の観光戦略	Yasuna Mizobata
59	October 26, 2018	November 14, 2018	JR Central: Enticing Tourists with Helpful Services & Events	観光列車ブームに頼らない JR東海の観光戦略	Yasuna Mizobata
60	November 9, 2018	December 5, 2018	Iwate Galaxy Railway: Launching Services for the Community	IGRいわて銀河鉄道 地域密着サービスで乗客を増やす	Yasuna Mizobata
61	November 23, 2018	December 12, 2018	Echizen Railway: Heading into the Future with the Community Onboard	地域が走らせる鉄道 えちぜん鉄道	Yasuna Mizobata
62	December 21, 2018	January 16, 2019	Seibu Railway: Setting its Sights on the Chichibu Region	ターゲットは秩父 西武鉄道の観光戦略	Yasuna Mizobata
63	January 18, 2019	January 30, 2019	New Year Trains: Beginning the New Year with a Journey	新年の特別列車 初詣列車と初日の出列車	Yasuna Mizobata
64	February 8, 2019	February 20, 2019	JR Gono Line: A Popular Local Line Worth the Journey	日本一乗りたいローカル線 JR五能線	Yasuna Mizobata
65	February 15, 2019	March 20, 2019	Amaterasu Railway: A Tourist Attraction Making the Most of a Discontinued Line	廃線観光で復活! 宮崎県・高千穂あまてらす鉄道	Yokoyama Marina (横山真里奈) (NHK Miyazaki newscaster)
66	March 29, 2019	May 1, 2019	Yamanote Line: Tokyo's Ever Evolving Loop Line	JR山手線 進化を続ける東京の環状線	Yasuna Mizobata
67	April 12, 2019	May 15, 2019	JR Hokkaido's Yubari Line: A Beloved Local Line Comes to an End	廃止に追い込まれるローカル線 JR石勝線夕張支線	Yasuna Mizobata
68	April 26, 2019	May 29, 2019	Tokyo Metro: A Subway Network On Time & On Track	東京メトロ 世界に誇る正確・安全性	Yasuna Mizobata
69	May 24, 2019	July 10, 2019	Nishi-Nippon Railroad: Fine Dining on an Even Finer Tourist Train	食にこだわる観光列車 西日本鉄道	Yasuna Mizobata
70	May 31, 2019	July 24, 2019	Hiroshima Electric Railway: On Track on the Streets	都市輸送を担う路面電車 広島電鉄	Yasuna Mizobata
71	June 28, 2019	August 21, 2019	Hankai Tramway: Osaka's One & Only Tram Network	大阪唯一の路面電車 阪堺電気軌道	Yasuna Mizobata
72	July 12, 2019	September 18, 2019	Choshi Electric Railway: Finding New Ways to Get Back on Track	全線6.4kmの軌跡 銚子電鉄	Yasuna Mizobata
73	July 26, 2019	October 9, 2019	JR Osaka Loop Line: Developing a Better, More User-Friendly Line	乗りたい路線に大改造 JR大阪環状線	Yasuna Mizobata
74	September 13, 2019	November 13, 2019	Kyoto Tango Railway: A Bus Company to the Rescue	バス会社は鉄道を救うか 京都丹後鉄道	Ishii Maiko (石井麻衣子)
75	September 27, 2019	December 11, 2019	South Hokkaido Railway: A Tourist Train Developed by a Tour Company	観光列車 道南いさりび鉄道	Yasuna Mizobata
76	October 11, 2019	January 8, 2020	Chizu Express: A Top Tier Third Sector Railway	三セク鉄道の優等生 智頭急行	
77	October 25, 2019	February 26, 2020	Hitachinaka Seaside Railway: Pulling Together with the Local Community	ひたちなか海浜鉄道	Yasuna Mizobata
78	November 8, 2019	March 25, 2020	JR's Ekinaka Development Project: A New Lifestyle Below the Chuo Line	進化する“エキナカ”ビジネス JR中央線	Yasuna Mizobata
79	November 22, 2019	February 5, 2020	Introducing the N700S: JR Central's Next-Generation Shinkansen	次世代新幹線N700Sの全貌 JR東海	
80	December 13, 2019	February 12, 2020	New Technology Opening the Future of the Railway	最新テクノロジーが開く“鉄道の未来” 鉄道技術展2019	Yasuna Mizobata
81	December 27, 2019	February 19, 2020	Reviewing the New Trains of 2019	次代を映す新型車両2019	Yasuna Mizobata
82	January 17, 2020	April 20, 2020	Sunrise Seto and Izumo: The Last of the Overnight Sleeper Trains	生き残った寝台列車 サンライズ瀬戸・出雲	Donna Burke
83	February 14, 2020	May 13, 2020	Echigo Tokimeki Railway: A Railway for Everyone	鉄道は赤字でも地域は黒字にできる えちごトキめき鉄道	Yasuna Mizobata
84	March 27, 2020	June 10, 2020	A Guide to Tokyo's Airport Access Lines	最新情報! 成田、羽田アクセス線	Marie Yanaka
85	April 17, 2020	September 16, 2020	Kintetsu Railway's Hinotori: Challenging the Shinkansen with Comfort	近鉄「ひのとり」の“くつろぎ”戦略	Yasuna Mizobata
86	May 1, 2020	May 26, 2020	Takanawa Gateway Station: The New Gateway to Tokyo	高輪ゲートウェイ駅の全貌	
87	June 5, 2020	June 17, 2020	Securing the Future of Japan's Local Railways	ローカル鉄道活性化への取り組み	
88	July 10, 2020	July 29, 2020	The Blue Ribbon & Laurel Prize: Japan's Best New Trains	ブルーリボン賞・ローレル賞	
89	July 31, 2020	August 5, 2020	Bicycle Onboard: Cycling with JR East	自転車; JR東日本の取り組み	Michael Rice
90	August 7, 2020	October 7, 2020	Heisei Chikuho Railway: A Tourist Train Recovering from the Pandemic	自転車 平成筑豊鉄道 コロナ禍での観光列車の運行再開	Naoka Ogata
91	September 18, 2020	October 14, 2020	Tsugaru Railway: Surviving the Coronavirus Pandemic	津軽鉄道（青森県）コロナ禍を乗り越えて	

YouTube Playlist of all publicly available episodes (This is not NHK official playlist. Please read playlist comment.)

== See also ==
- See the World by Train
