= Izumo (train) =

Japanese overnight sleeper train service

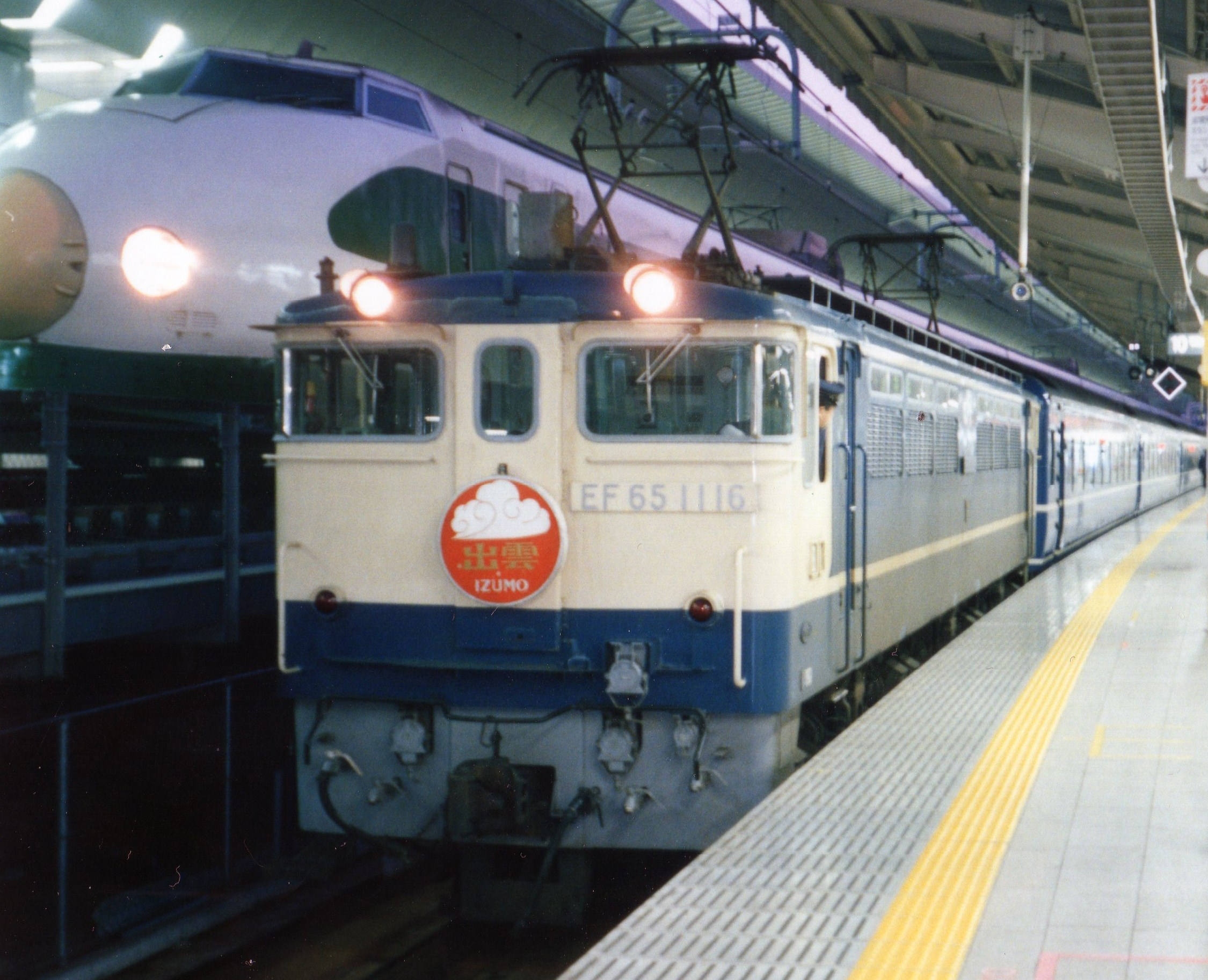
- An Izumo service at Tokyo Station, December 1997

Overview
- Service type: Limited express
- Status: Discontinued
- Locale: Japan
- First service: 29 June 1947 (Semi express); 19 November 1956 (Express); 15 March 1972 (Limited express)
- Last service: 18 March 2006
- Successor: Sunrise Izumo
- Current operator(s): JR West
- Former operator(s): JNR

Route
- Termini: Tokyo; Hamada
- Distance travelled: 1,042 km (647 mi)
- Average journey time: 15 hours 11 minutes (1998)
- Service frequency: 2 return workings daily

Technical
- Rolling stock: 14 series, 24/25 series sleeping cars
- Track gauge: 1,067 mm (3 ft 6 in)
- Electrification: 1,500 V DC

The Izumo (出雲) was a limited express overnight sleeping car train service in Japan operated by Japanese National Railways (JNR) and later by West Japan Railway Company (JR West), which ran from Tokyo to Izumoshi and Hamada in Shimane Prefecture until March 2006.

== Rolling stock ==
In its latter years, the Izumo service was operated using JR East 24/25 series sleeping cars based at Oku Depot in Tokyo. Services were however operated by JR West staff.

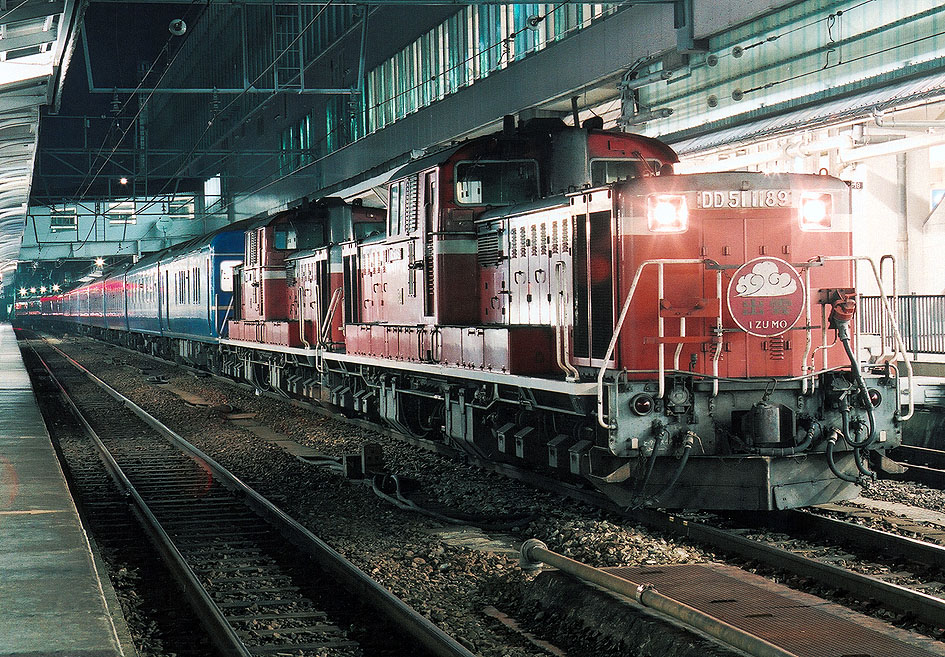
The Izumo 1 service at Okayama hauled by a pair of DD51 diesel locomotives, 1993

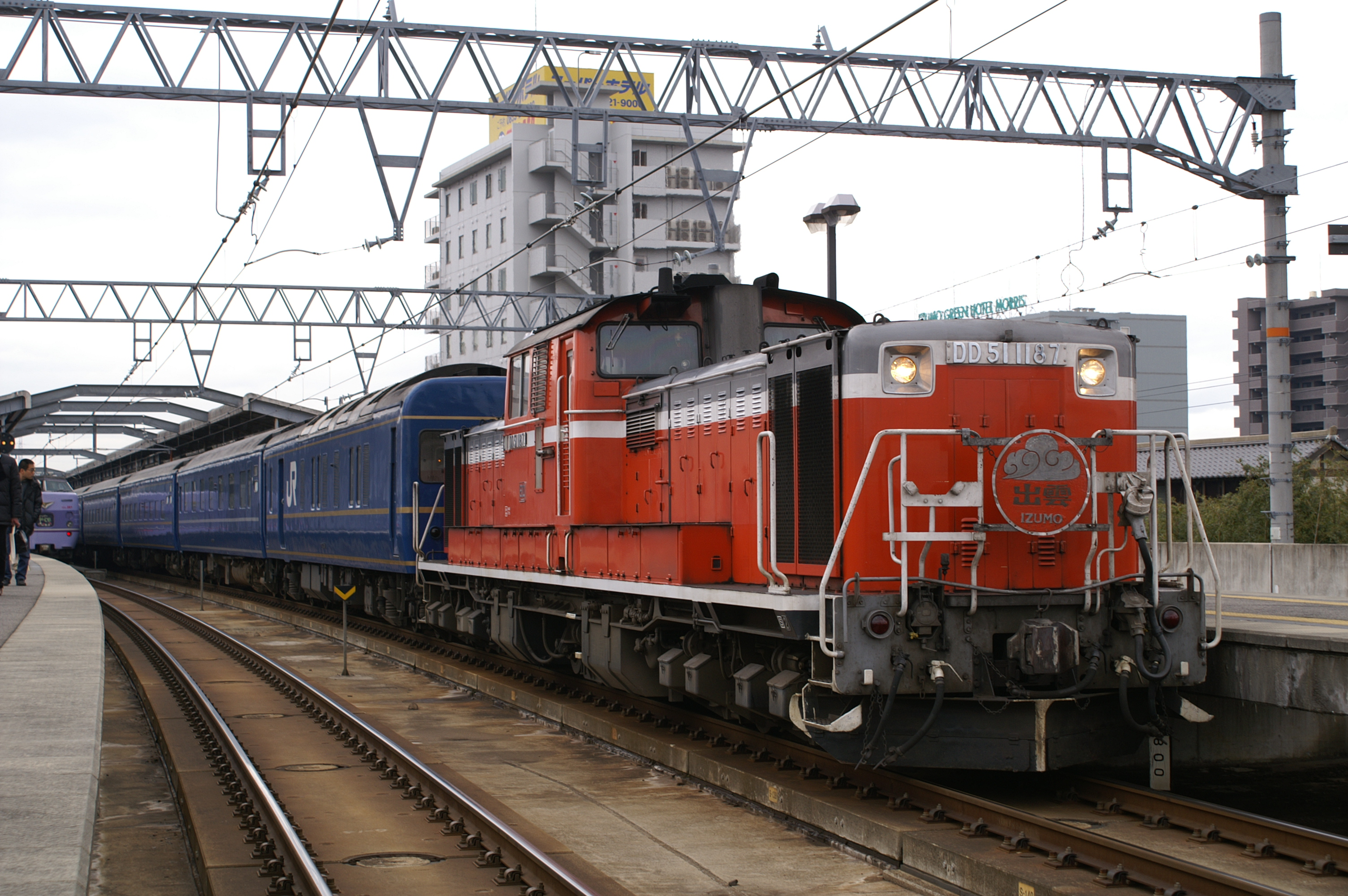
The Izumo service at Izumoshi, hauled by DD51 1187, January 2006

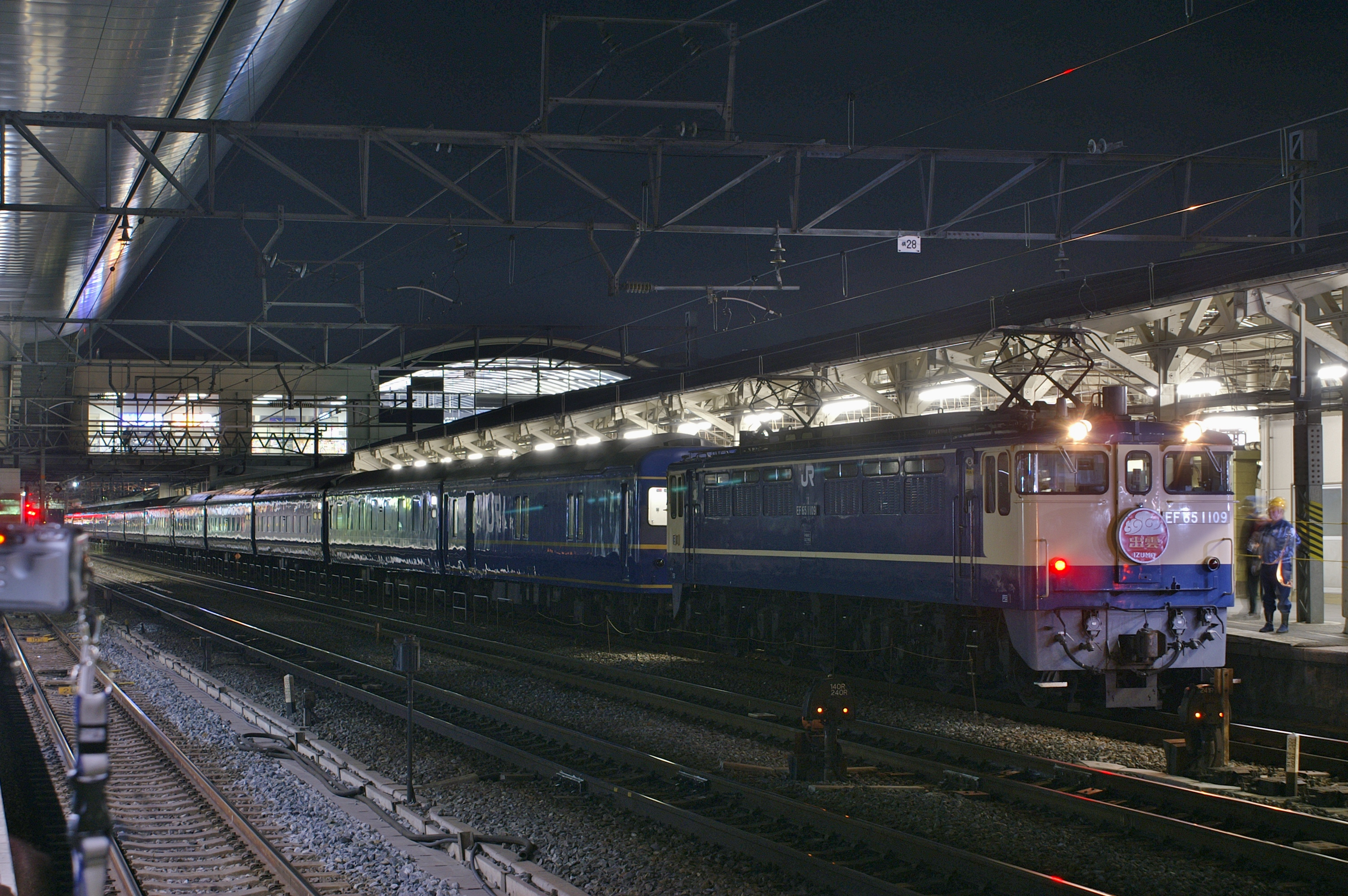
EF65 1109 coupling onto the Izumo service at Kyoto Station, March 2006

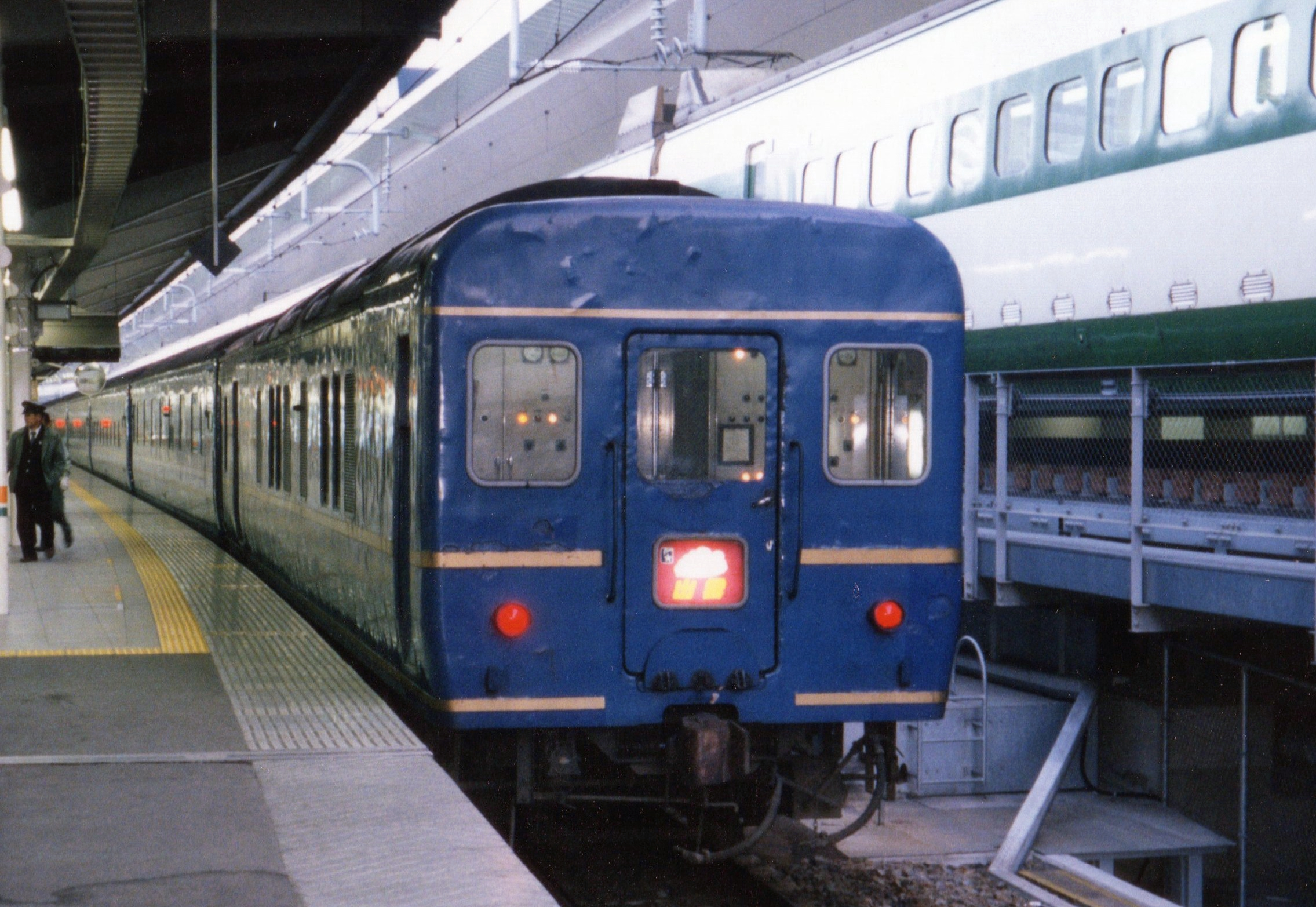
Rear end of the Izumo 4 service at Tokyo Station, December 1997

== History ==
The Izumo service (written in hiragana as いずも) commenced on 29 June 1947, as a "semi-express" service operating between Osaka and Taisha Station (now closed). From 19 November 1956, this was upgraded to become an "express" service (written in kanji as 出雲) operating between Tokyo and Hamada. From 15 March 1972, the train was upgraded to become a "limited express" service.

From 10 July 1998, one pair of Izumo services was replaced by new 285 series electric multiple unit trains running as the Sunrise Izumo together with the Sunrise Seto via Okayama. The remaining pair of services followed the original route, travelling over the Sanin Main Line west of Kyoto, via Fukuchiyama.

The last remaining Izumo services were withdrawn from the start of the revised timetable on 18 March 2006.

== See also ==
- Blue Train (Japan)
