= 285 series =

Japanese train type

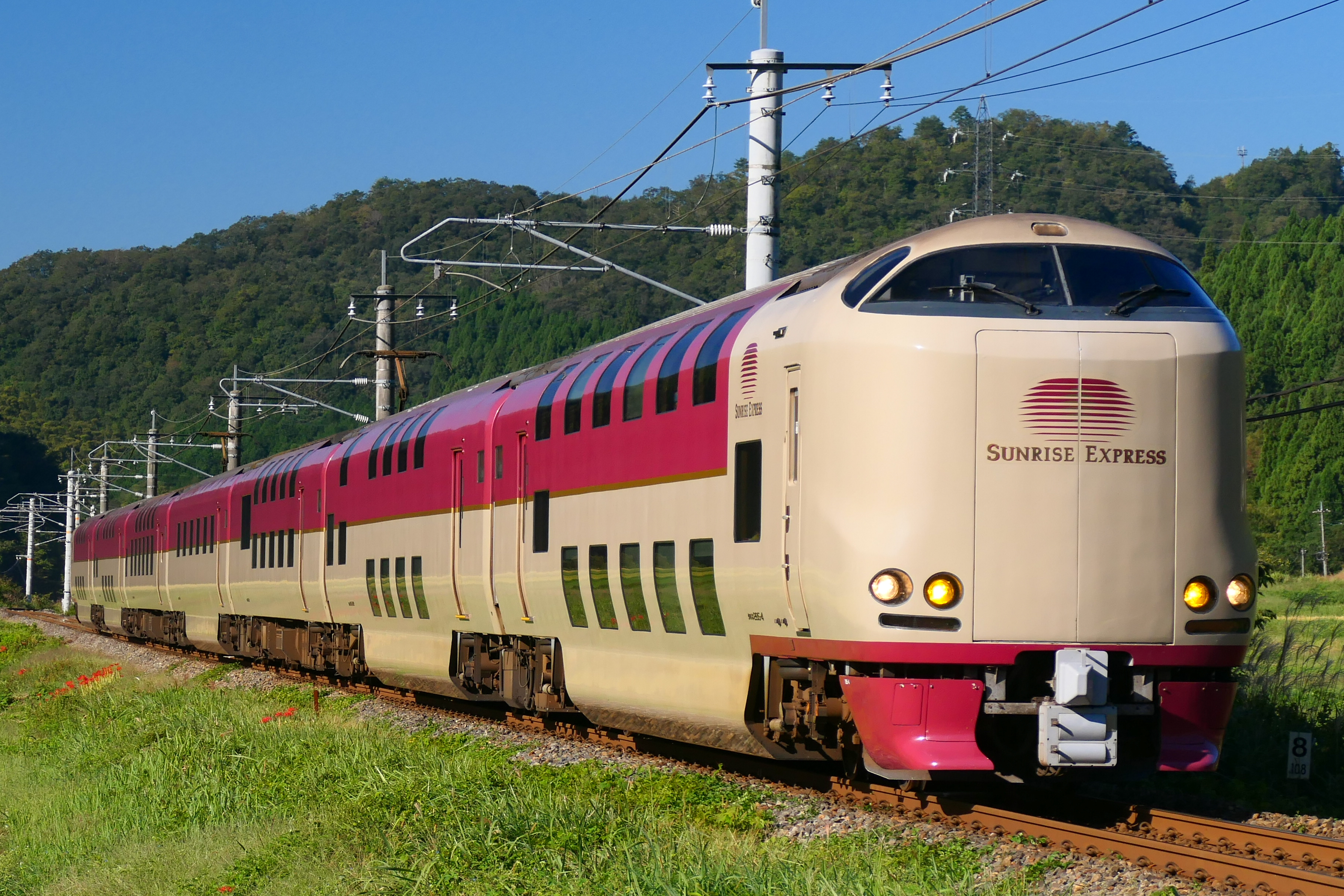
- 285 series on a Sunrise Izumo service, October 2022
- Manufacturers: Kawasaki Heavy Industries, Nippon Sharyo, Kinki Sharyo
- Family name: Sunrise Express
- Constructed: 1998
- Entered service: 10 July 1998
- Number built: 35 vehicles (5 sets)
- Number in service: 35 vehicles (5 sets)
- Formation: 7 cars per trainset
- Fleet numbers: I1-I5
- Operators: JR Central, JR-West
- Depots: Ōgaki, Gotō
- Lines served: Tokaido Main Line, San'yō Main Line, Seto-Ōhashi Line, Hakubi Line, Sanin Main Line

Specifications
- Car body construction: Steel
- Car length: 21,670 mm (71 ft 1 in)
- Width: 2,945 mm (9 ft 7.9 in)
- Height: 4,090 mm (13 ft 5 in)
- Maximum speed: 130 km/h (80 mph)
- Traction system: Variable frequency (3-level IGBT)
- Power output: 1,760 kW
- Power supply: 1,500 V DC
- Bogies: WDT58, WTR242
- Braking system: Electronically controlled pneumatic brakes with regenerative or dynamic braking
- Safety systems: ATS-P, ATS-SW
- Track gauge: 1,067 mm (3 ft 6 in)

Notes/references
- This train won the 42nd Blue Ribbon Award in 1999.

The 285 series (285系, 285-kei) is a sleeper electric multiple unit (EMU) train type operated jointly by Central Japan Railway Company (JR Central) and West Japan Railway Company (JR-West) on the overnight Sunrise Izumo and Sunrise Seto limited express services in Japan. These EMUs were introduced from 10 July 1998 to replace ageing locomotive-hauled "Blue Train" coaches which once operated on separate Seto and Izumo services between Tokyo, Shikoku and the San'in region.

== Livery ==
The trains are finished in a livery of "Morning Glow" red and "Morning Mist" beige with "Sun Rise" gold lining.

== Formations ==
As of 1 April 2015, the fleet consists of five sets, numbered I1 to I5. I1 to I3 are owned by JR-West, and are classified 285-0 series. Sets I4 and I5 are owned by JR Central, and are classified 285-3000 series (the individual cars are numbered in the 3000 range). All sets, I1 to I5, are composed as follows, with two motored ("M") cars and five non-powered trailer ("T") cars. Car 7 and 14 is at the Tokyo (eastern) end.

Car No.	1/8	2/9	3/10	4/11	5/12	6/13	7/14
Designation	TNWC'	TNW2	MN	TNWS	MN2	TNW	TNWC
Numbering	KuHaNe 285	SaHaNe 285-200	MoHaNe 285	SaRoHaNe 285	MoHaNe 285-200	SaHaNe 285	KuHaNe 285

The cars of JR Central sets I4 and I5 are numbered in the -3000 series. The motor cars are each fitted with one WPS28A single-arm pantograph. The motor cars in sets I1 and I3 each have two.

== Interior ==
Each car includes toilet facilities.

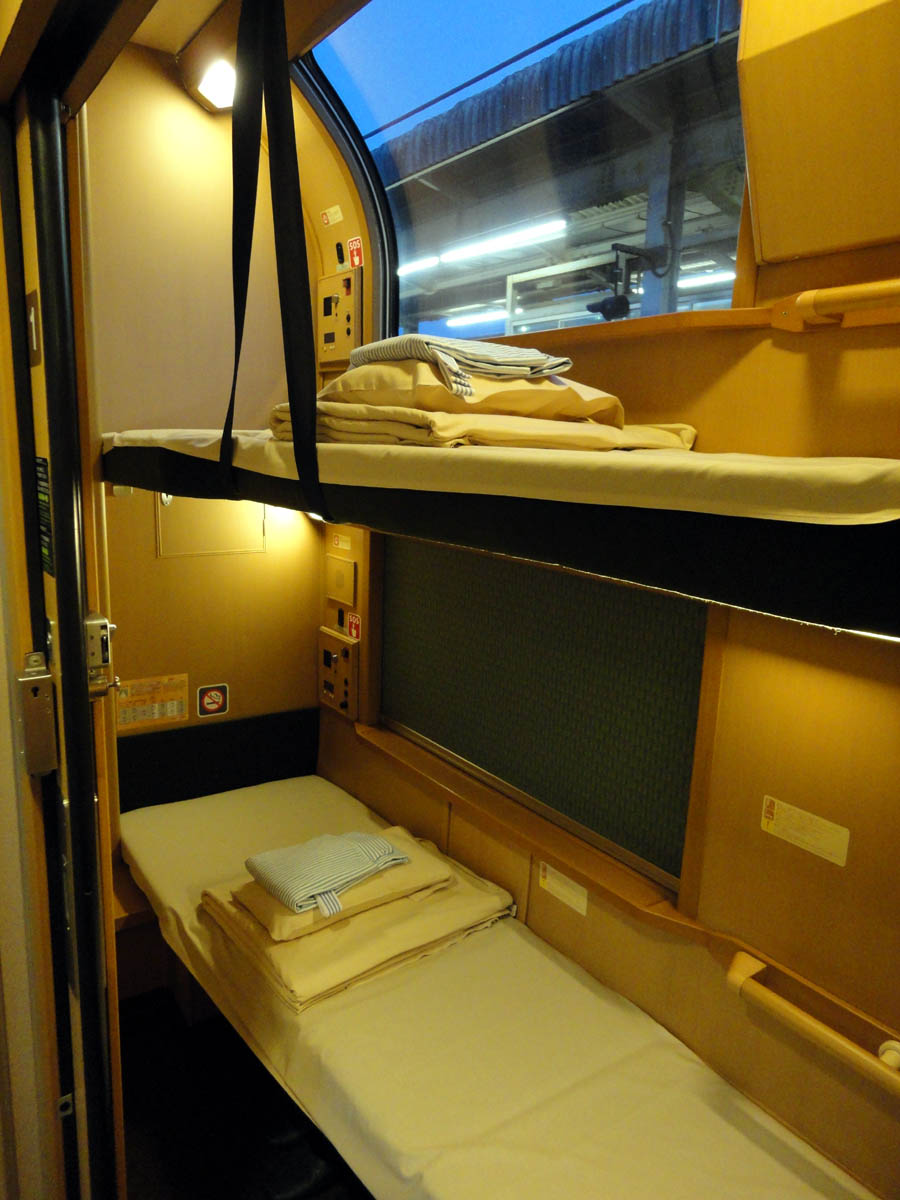
B single-twin berths

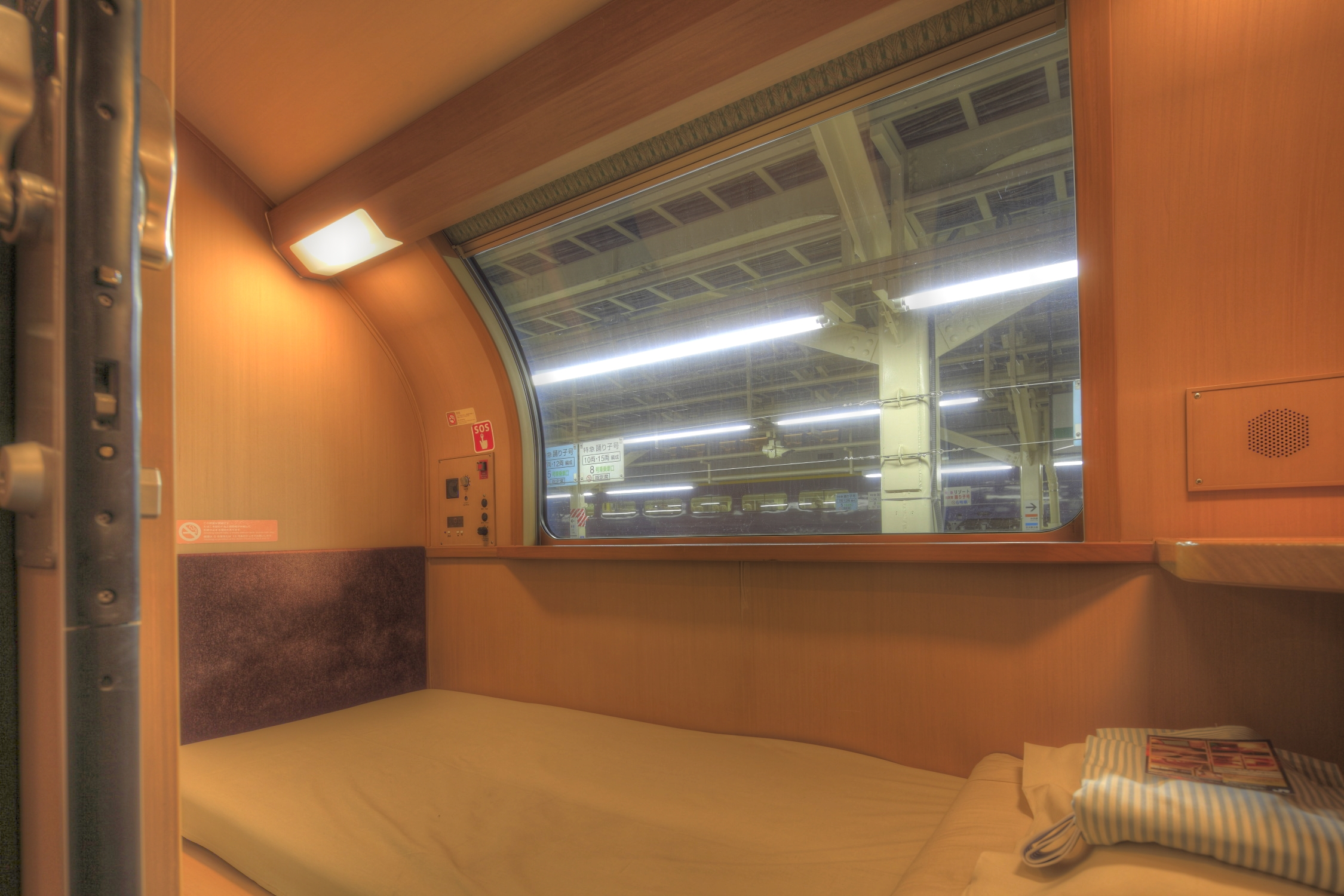
B single berths

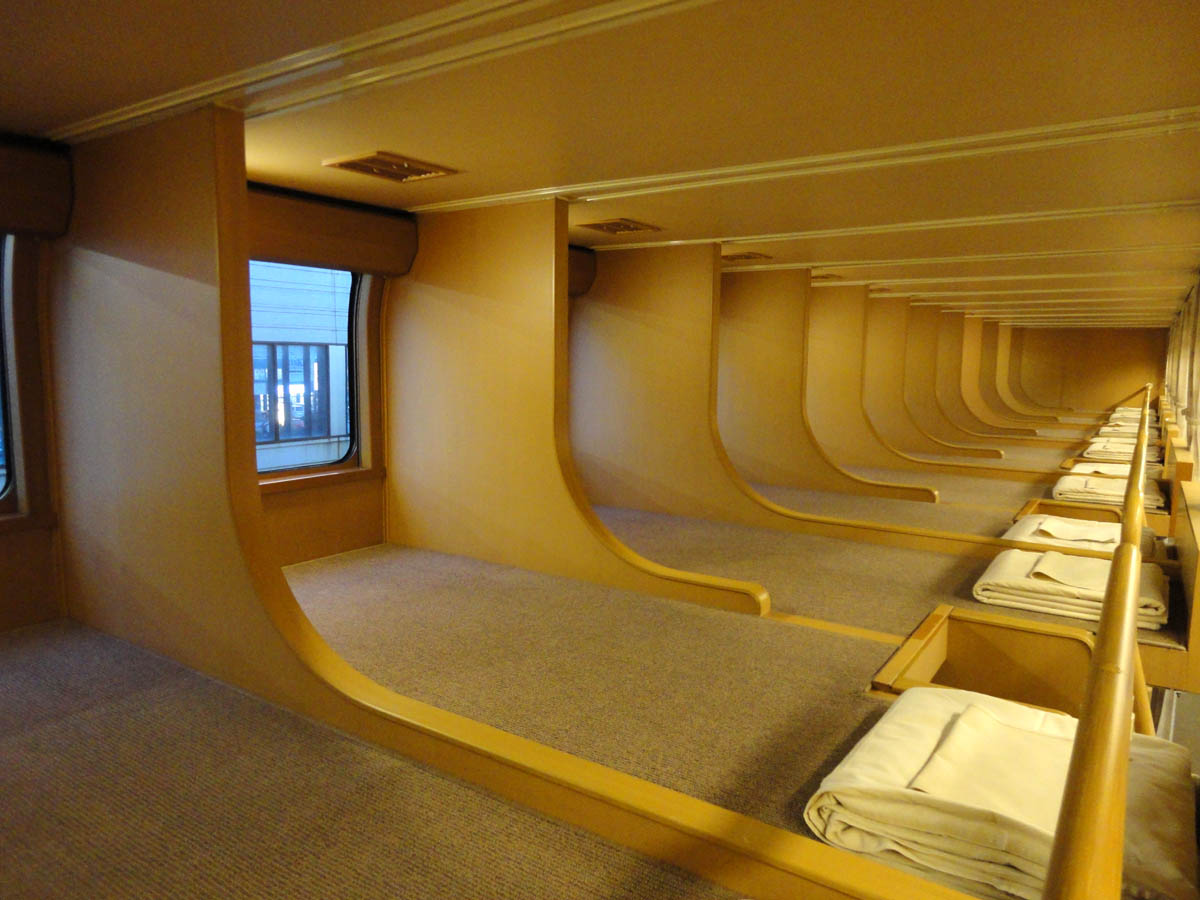
Nobinobi floor space (Upper)

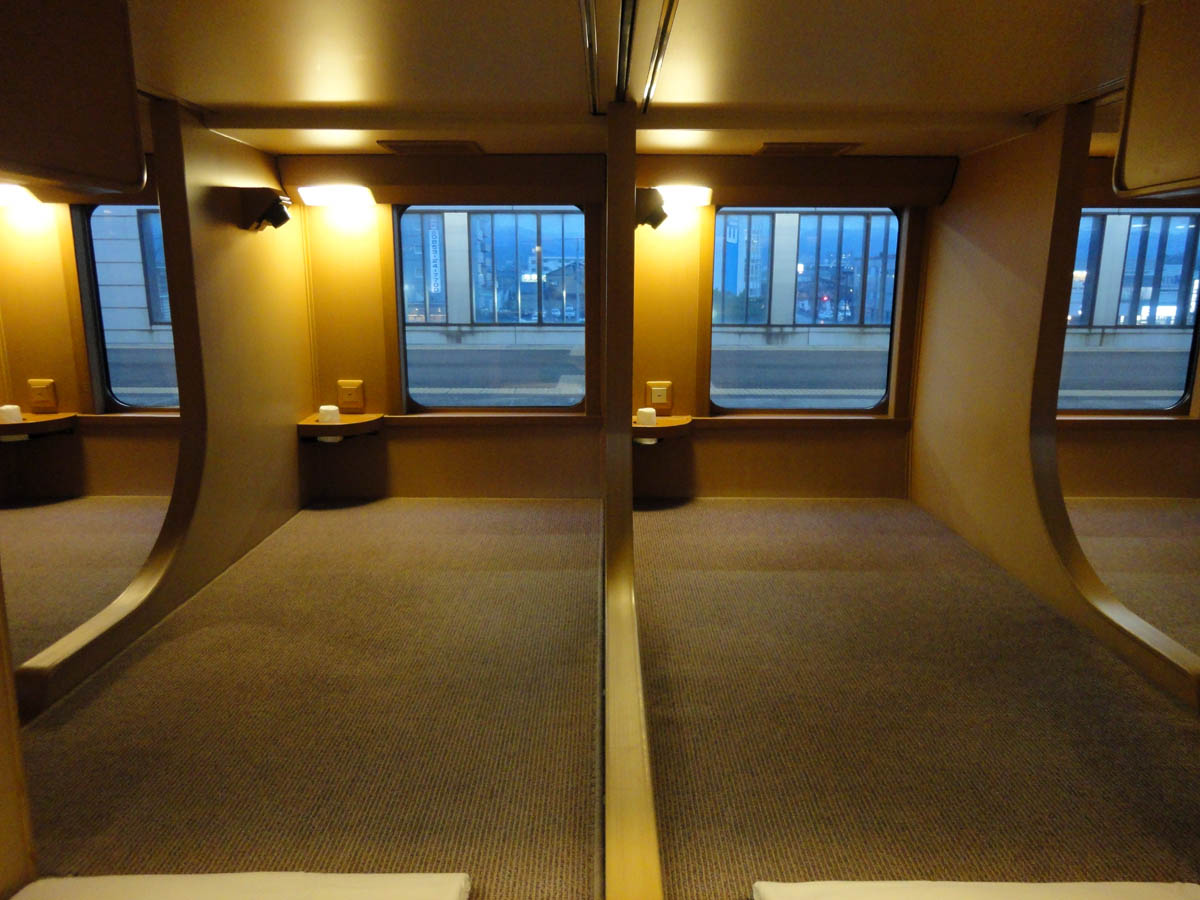
Nobinobi floor space (Lower)

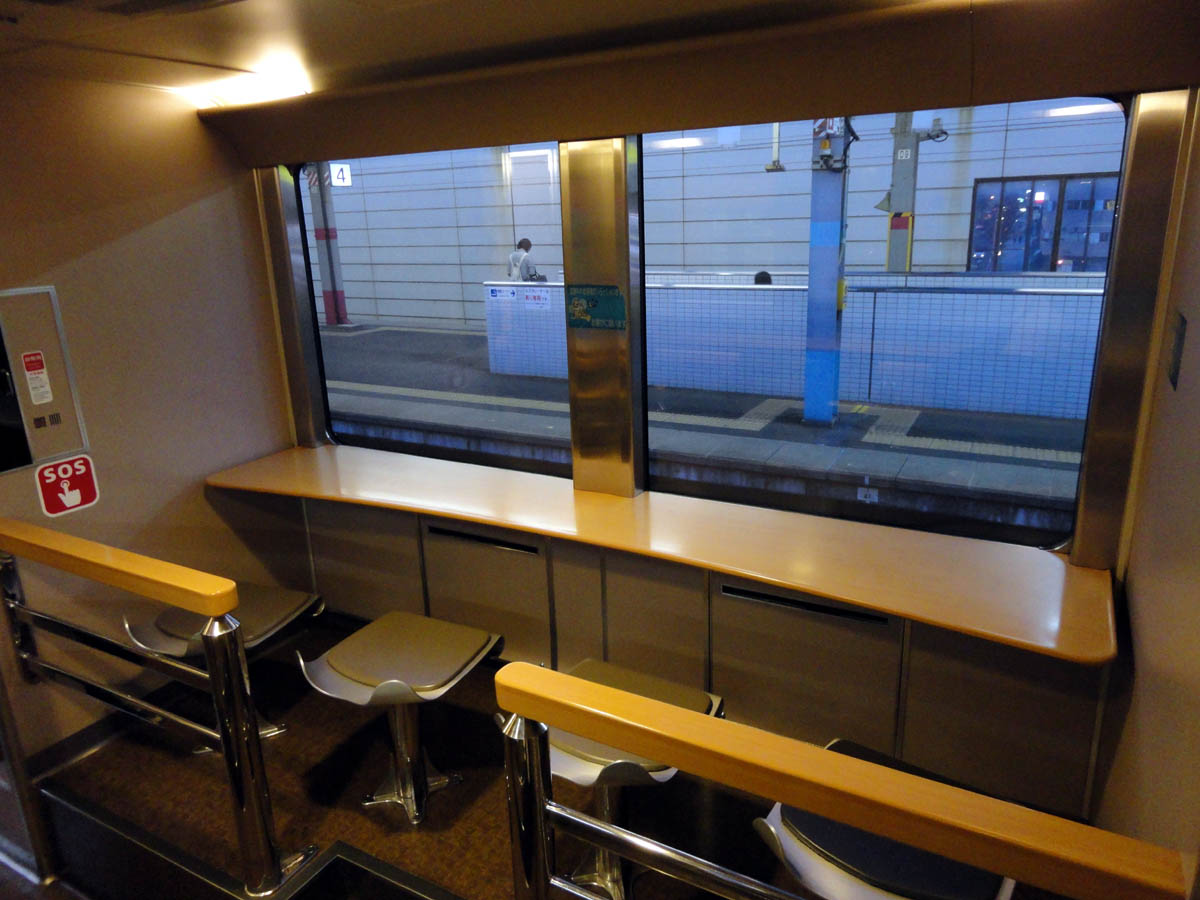
Mini saloon area

== Fleet details ==
The individual build details of the fleet are as shown below.

Set No.	Manufacturer	Date delivered
I1	Kinki Sharyo	19 March 1998
I2	Kinki Sharyo	15 April 1998
I3	Kawasaki Heavy Industries	1 May 1998
I4	Kinki Sharyo	8 April 1998
I5	Nippon Sharyo	24 April 1998

== History ==
The trains entered service on 10 July 1998, with set I4 forming the down Sunrise Izumo, set I5 forming the down Sunrise Seto, set I3 forming the up Sunrise Izumo, and set I2 forming the up Sunrise Seto.

== See also ==
- 583 series, the first Japanese sleeping-car EMU type
