= JNR Class EF65 =

Japanese electric locomotive class

Class EF65
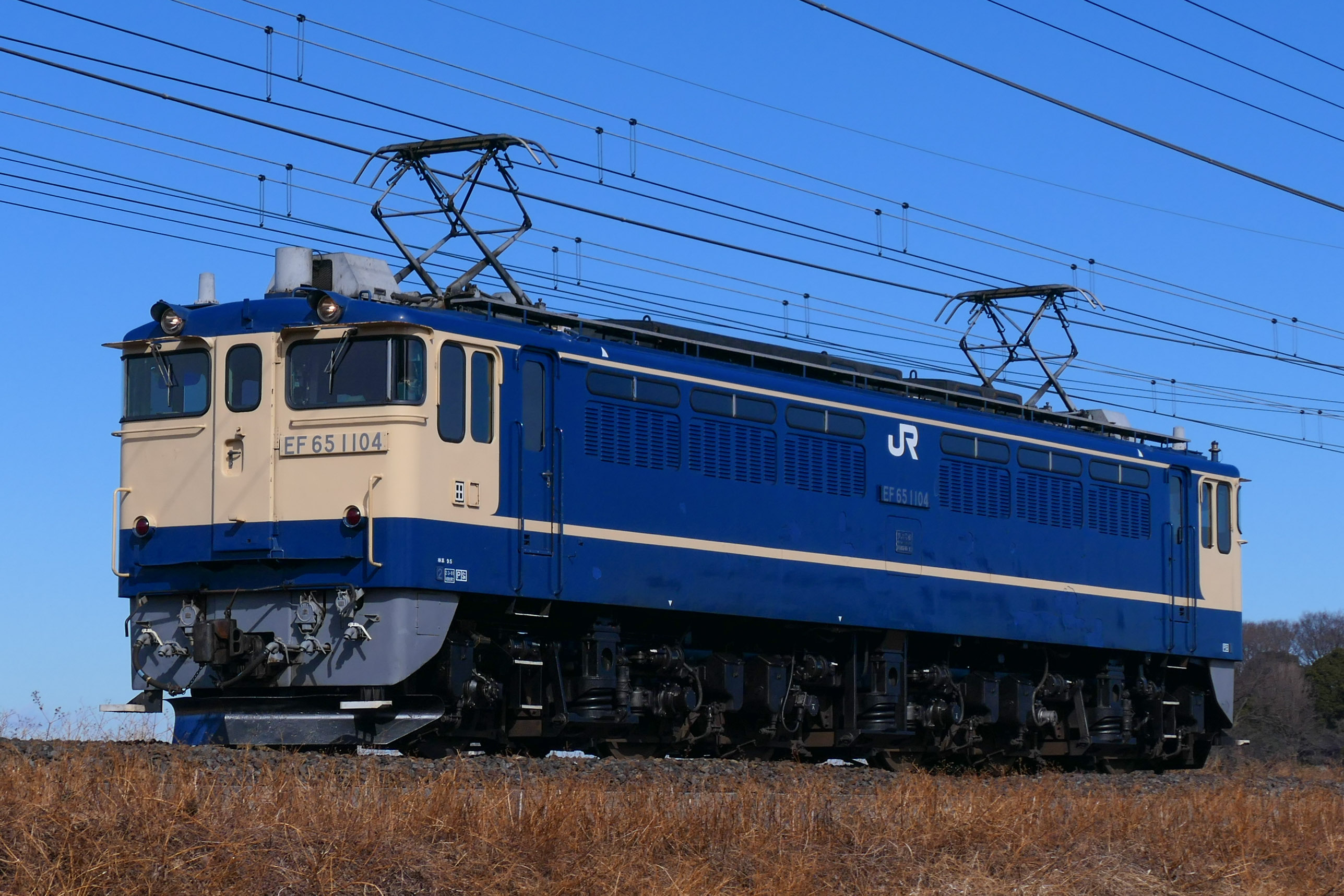
- JR East EF65 1104, February 2021
Type and origin
- Power type: Electric
- Builder: Fuji Electric, Kawasaki Sharyō, Kisha, Nippon Sharyo, Toshiba
- Build date: 1965–1979
- Total produced: 308
Specifications
- Configuration
  - UIC: Bo'Bo'Bo'
  - Commonwealth: Bo-Bo-Bo
- Gauge: 1,067 mm (3 ft 6 in)
- Bogies: DT115B (outer), DT116C (centre)
- Wheel diameter: 1,120 mm (44.09 in)
- Length: 16,500 mm (54 ft 1 5/8 in)
- Width: 2,800 mm (9 ft 2 1/4 in)
- Height: 3,819 mm (12 ft 6 3/8 in)
- Loco weight: 96 tonnes (94 long tons; 106 short tons)
- Electric system/s: 1,500 V DC Overhead catenary
- Current pickup: Pantograph
- Traction motors: DC motors (MT52A) (x6)
- Transmission: One-stage reduction gear (18:69)
- Loco brake: Air and Electrical regenerative
- Train brakes: Air
- Safety systems: ATS-SF
Performance figures
- Maximum speed: 110 km/h (70 mph)
- Power output: 2.55 MW (3,420 hp)
- Tractive effort: 199.43 kN (44,830 lbf)
Career
- Operators: JNR, JR West, JR East, JR Freight
- Number in class: 52 (as of 1 April 2016)
- Delivered: 1965
- Preserved: 7
- Disposition: 52 still in service

The Class EF65 (EF65形) is a 6-axle (Bo-Bo-Bo wheel arrangement) DC electric locomotive type operated on passenger and freight services in Japan since 1965. A total of 308 locomotives were built between 1965 and 1979, with 52 still in service as of 1 April 2016. As of 1 November 2026, 22 remain in storage for spare duty, none are in active daily revenue service.

== Variants ==
The class was initially divided into the EF65-0 subclass for general freight and the EF65-500 subclass for express freight and passenger use.

- EF65-0: Numbers EF65 1 – 135
- EF65-500: Numbers EF65 501 – 542
- EF65-1000: Numbers EF65 1001 – 1139
- EF65-2000:

== Background and history ==
The Class EF65 was designed by Japanese National Railways (JNR) as a standard locomotive type developed from the earlier Class EF60 design for use primarily on the Tokaido Main Line and Sanyo Main Line.

== Operations ==
During the JNR era, these locomotives were used for freight trains and also for passenger work - primarily hauling night trains such as the Izumo sleeping car limited express and Ginga sleeping car express.

== EF65-0 ==
The EF65-0 subclass was designed for general freight use on the Tokaido Main Line and Sanyo Main Line. 135 locomotives were built between 1965 and 1970.

As of 2016, all EF65-0 locomotives had been withdrawn.

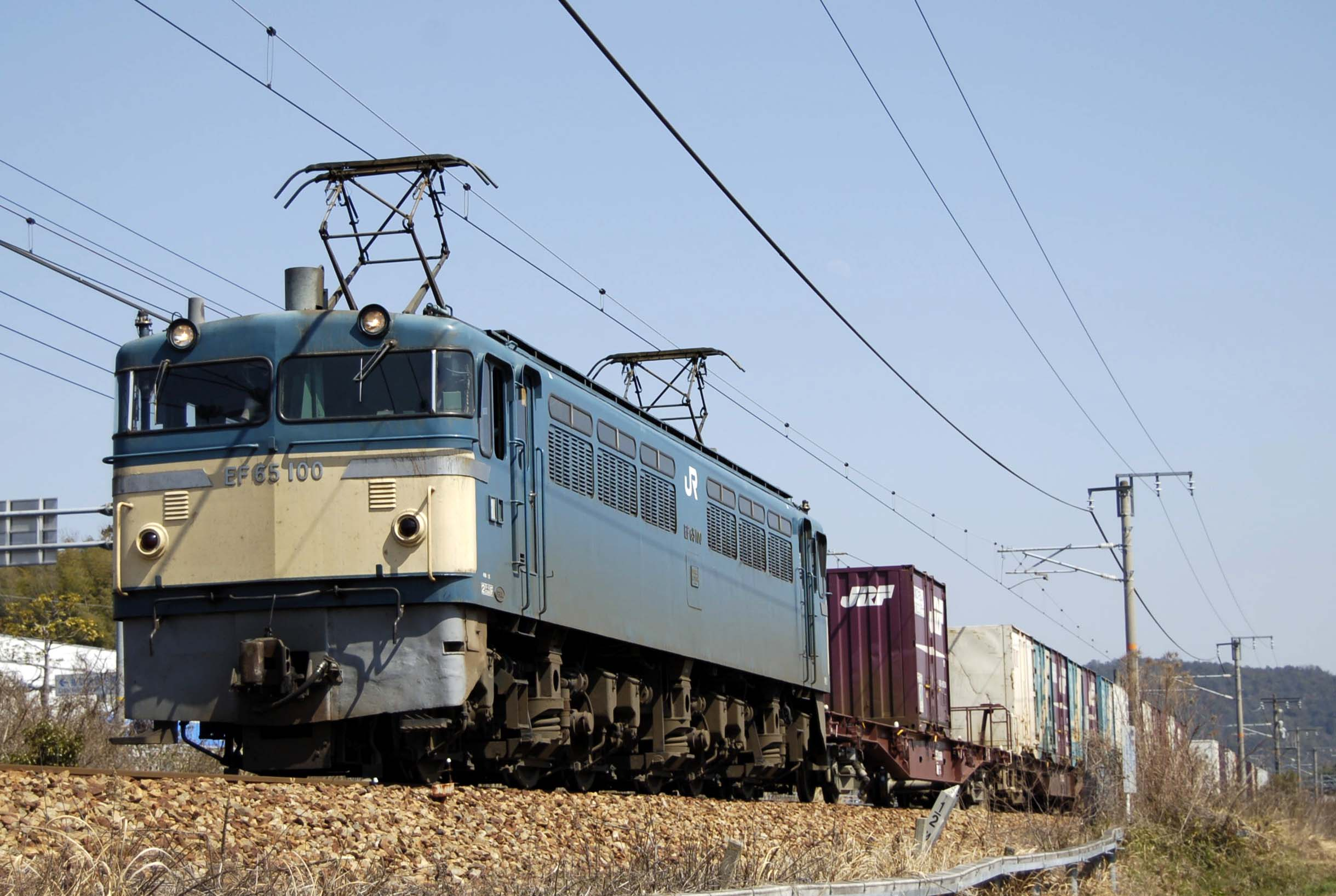
JR Freight EF65 100 in original blue livery in March 2008

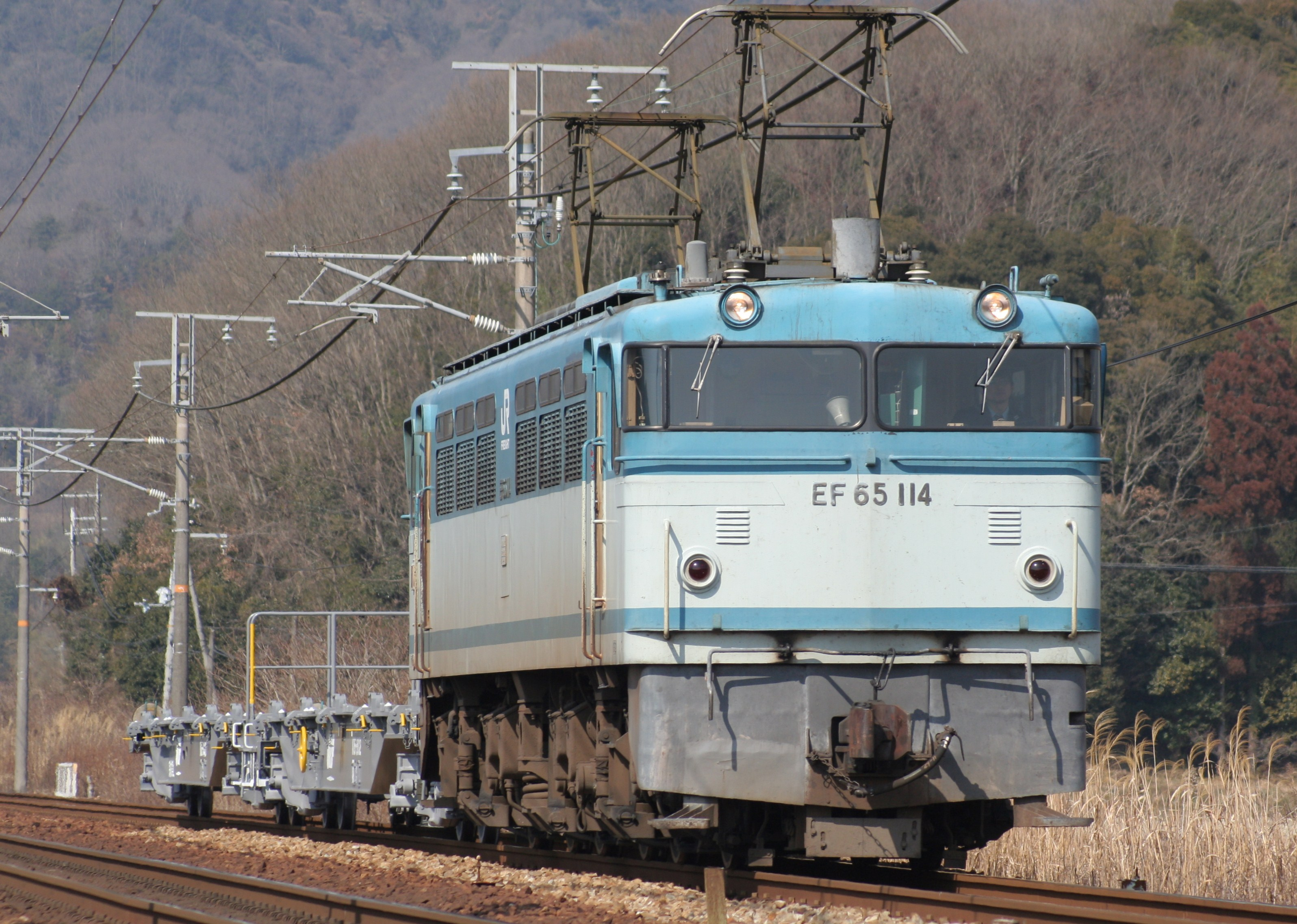
Refurbished JR Freight EF65 114 in February 2010

=== EF67 banker conversions ===
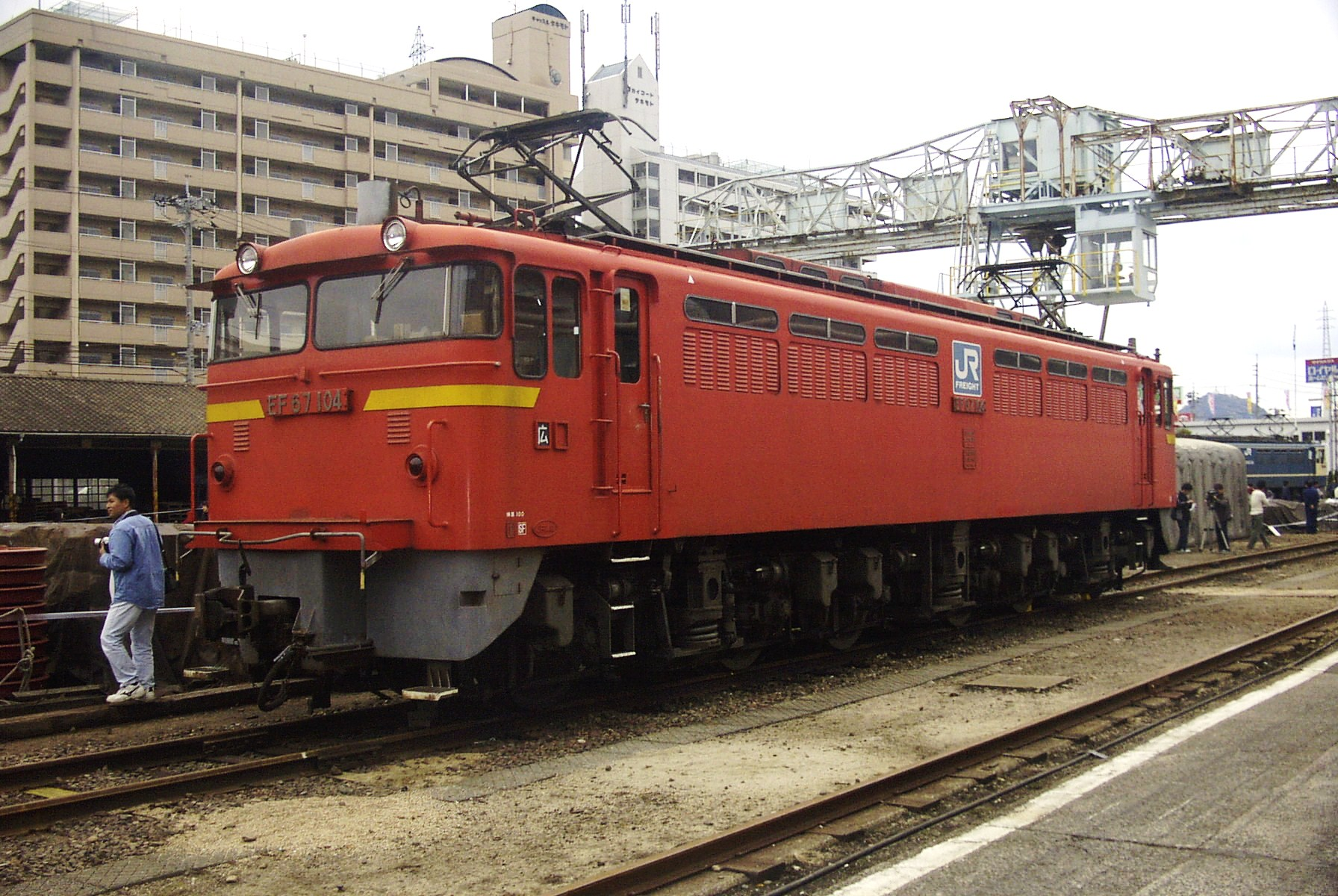
Original EF67 104 in October 2002

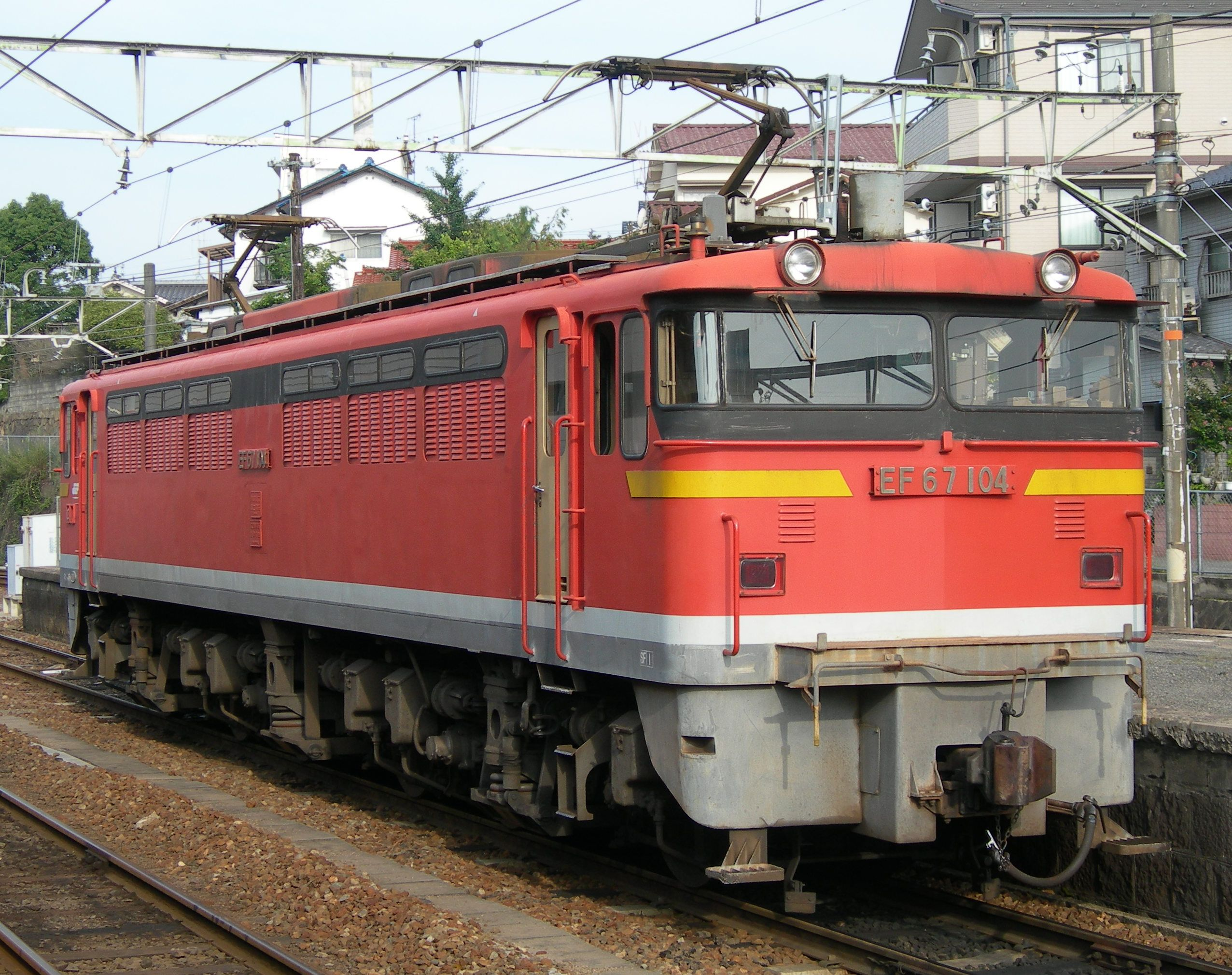
Refurbished EF67 104 in August 2009

Five 6th-batch Class EF65-0 locomotives, numbers EF65 131 to EF65 135, were converted in 1990 and 1991 to become Class EF67-100 banking locomotives for use on the "Senohachi" section of the Sanyo Main Line.

Original number	Built	Later number	Rebuilt
EF65 131	16 July 1970	EF67 102	1 May 1990
EF65 132	20 July 1970	EF67 104	9 November 1990
EF65 133	30 July 1970	EF67 103	29 September 1990
EF65 134	6 August 1970	EF67 101	23 March 1990
EF65 135	20 August 1970	EF67 105	8 March 1991

== EF65-500 ==
The EF65-500 subclass consisted of a total of 42 locomotives, including newly built locomotives and locomotives (EF65 535 - 542) modified from the earlier EF65-0 subclass (EF65 77 - 84) for use on overnight sleeping car services and express freight services operating at a maximum speed of 110 km/h (70 mph).

As of 1 April 2016, only one EF65-500 locomotive, EF65-501, owned by JR East, remained in service.

=== P/F designation ===
Locomotives used for hauling passenger services are referred to as "P" type, and those used for freight services are referred to as "F" type. The original designations are as shown below.

Locomotive number	P/F designation
EF65 501	P
EF65 502	P
EF65 503	P
EF65 504	P
EF65 505	P
EF65 506	P
EF65 507	P
EF65 508	P
EF65 509	P
EF65 510	P
EF65 511	P
EF65 512	P
EF65 513	F
EF65 514	F
EF65 515	F
EF65 516	F
EF65 517	F
EF65 518	F
EF65 519	F
EF65 520	F
EF65 521	F
EF65 522	F
EF65 523	F
EF65 524	F
EF65 525	F
EF65 526	F
EF65 527	P
EF65 528	P
EF65 529	P
EF65 530	P
EF65 531	P
EF65 532	F
EF65 533	F
EF65 534	F
EF65 535	P
EF65 536	P
EF65 537	P
EF65 538	P
EF65 539	P
EF65 540	P
EF65 541	P
EF65 542	P

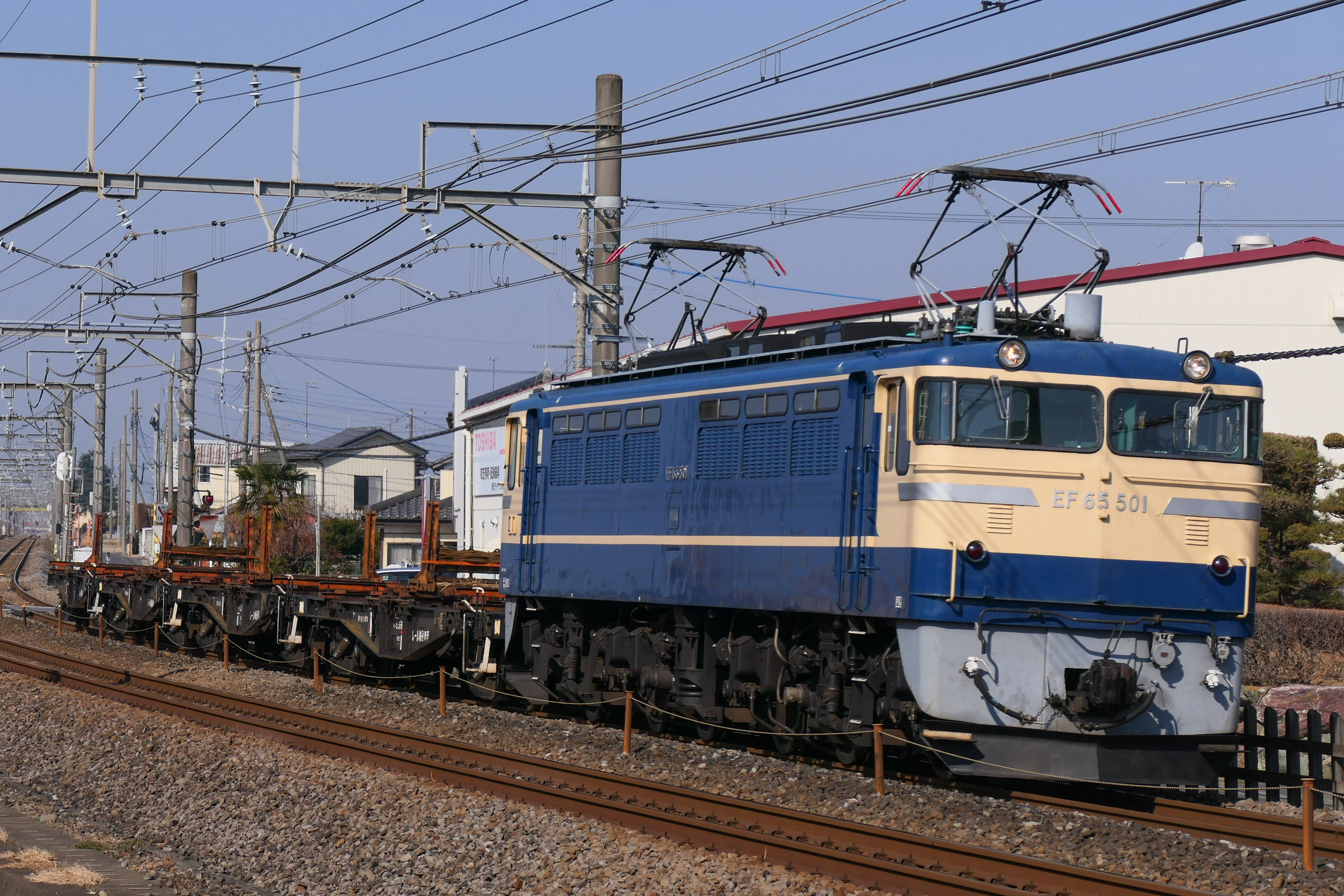
EF65 501 in original tokkyū livery in February 2021

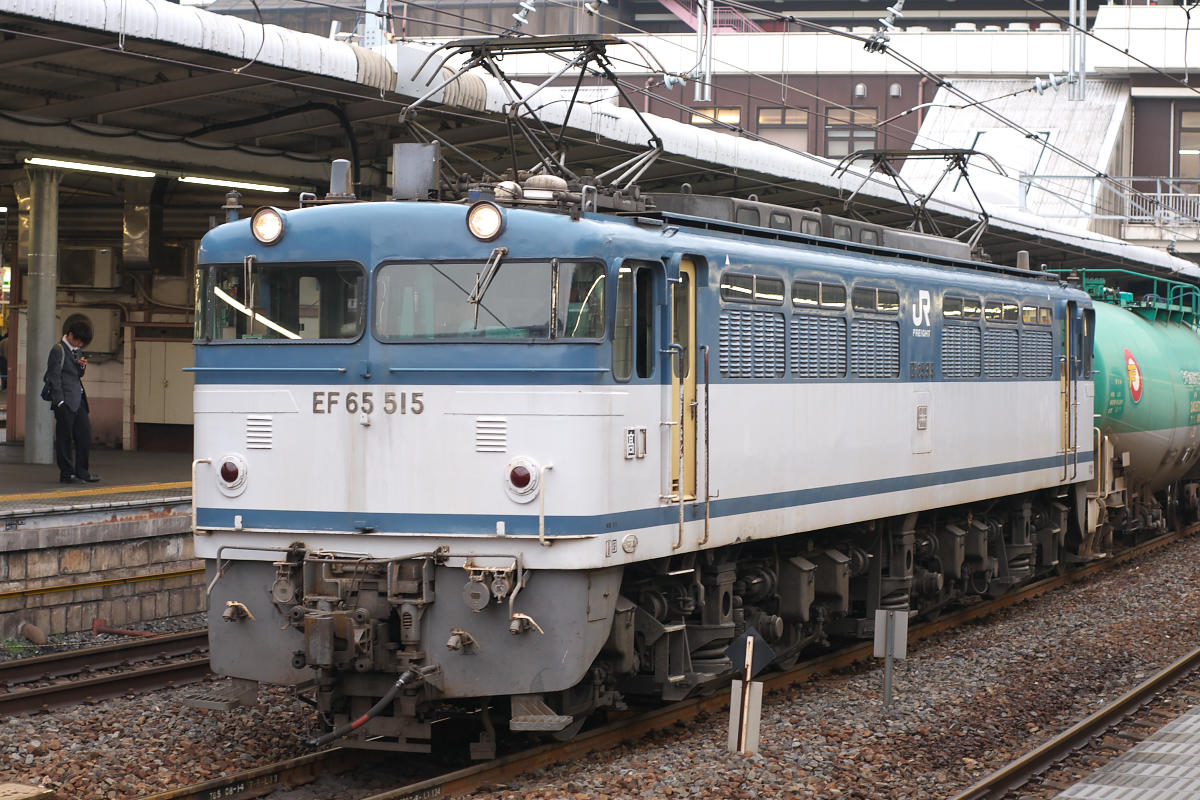
Refurbished JR Freight EF65 515 in March 2008

== EF65-1000 ==
The EF65-1000 was intended for use on both passenger and freight services, and was referred to as the "PF" type. 139 locomotives were built between 1969 and 1979.

As of 1 April 2016, 15 EF65-1000 locomotives remained in service, operated by JR East and JR West.

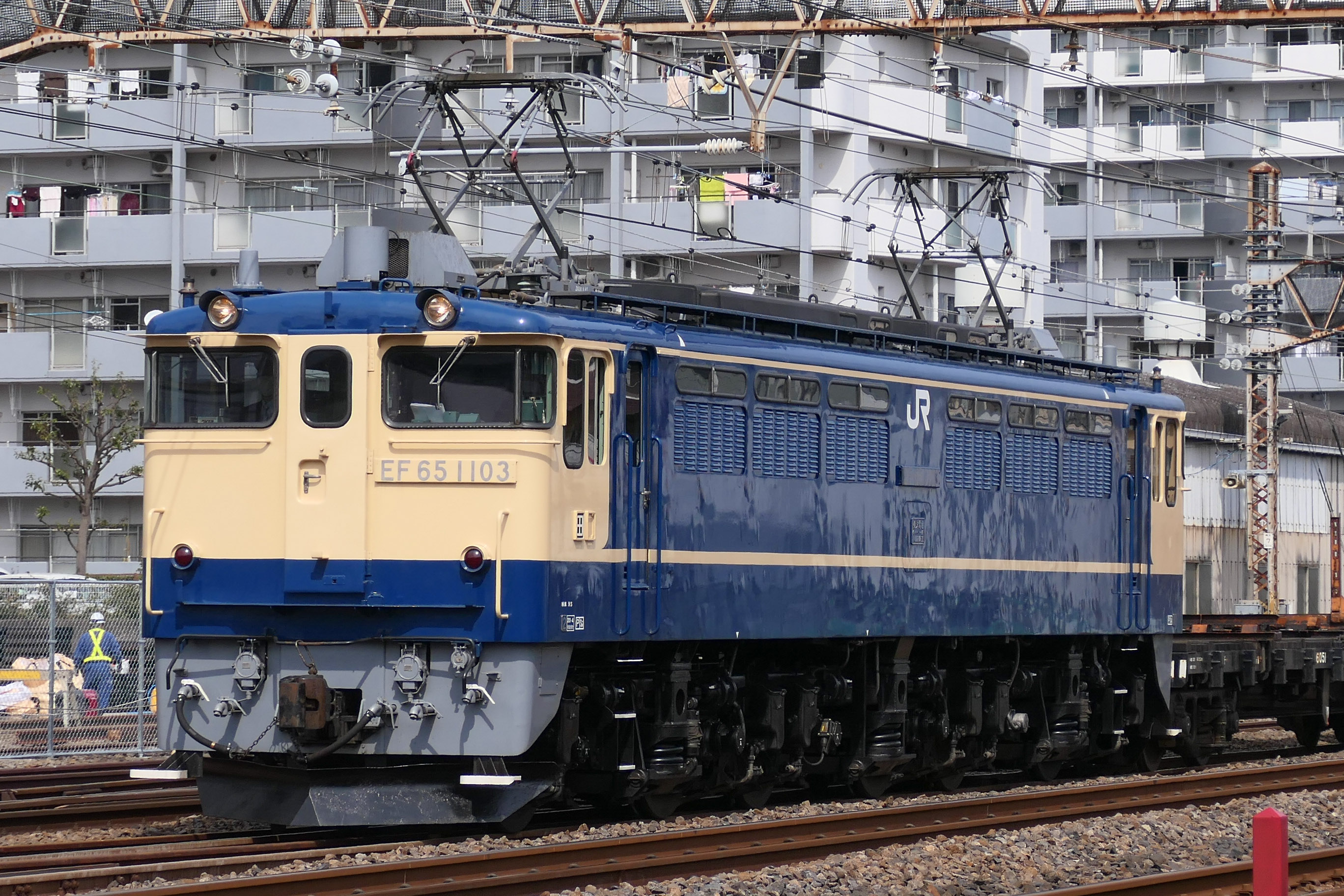
Passenger EF65 1103 in original "tokkyū" livery in March 2021

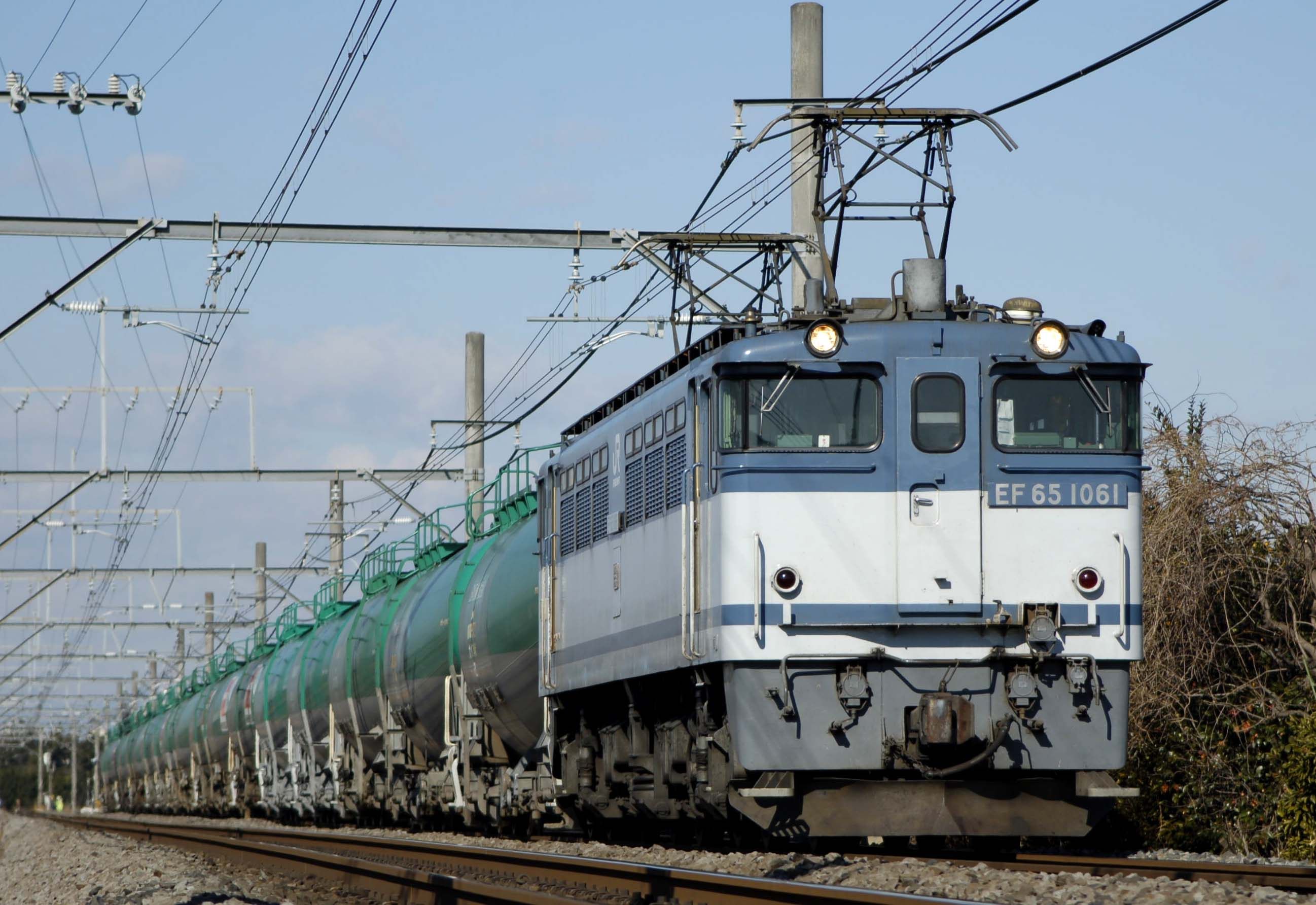
Refurbished JR Freight EF65 1061 in February 2008

== EF65-2000 ==
There are former Class EF65-1000 locomotives renumbered from May 2012 by JR Freight to differentiate them from locomotives fitted with driving recording units mandated for operations over 100 km/h (60 mph).

As of 1 April 2016, 36 EF65-2000 locomotives remained in service, operated by JR Freight.

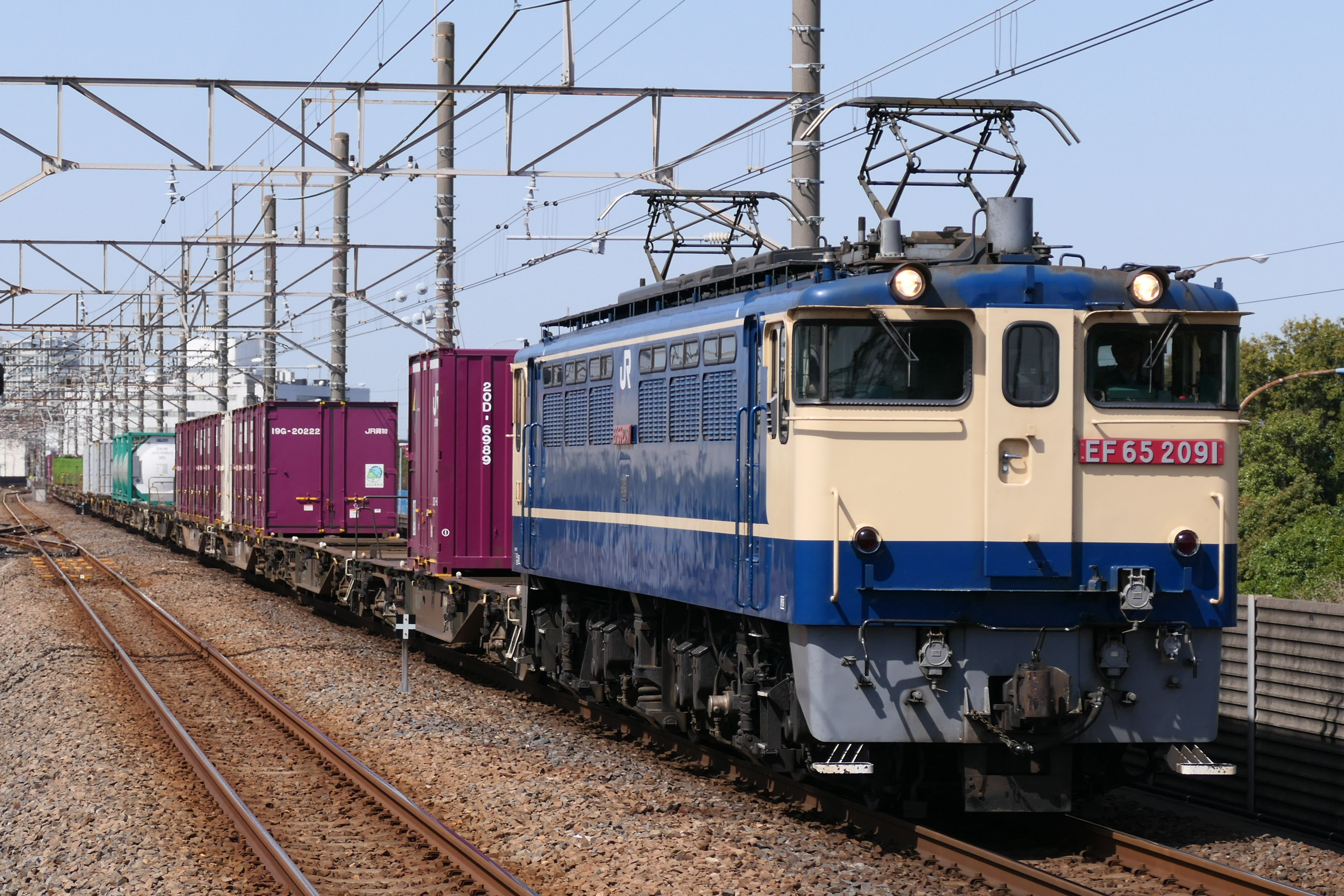
EF65 2091 in original tokkyu livery in March 2021

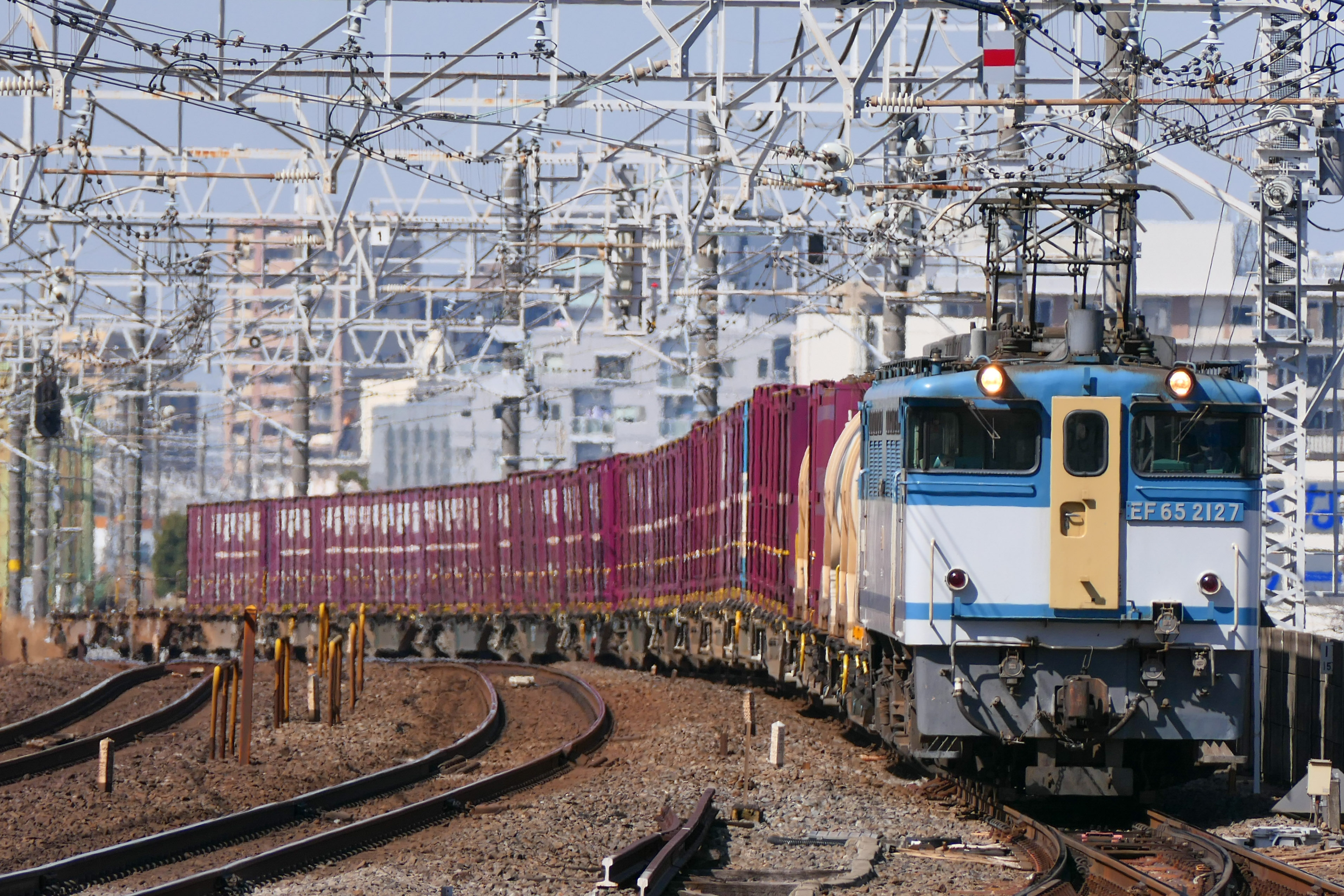
EF65 2127 in refurbished JR Freight livery in March 2021

== Fleet changes ==
Year	■ JR Freight	■ JR East	■ JR Central	■ JR West	Total	Ref
1987	199	42	5	23	269	
2009	77	8	0	10	95	
2016	36	6	0	10	52	

View chart definition.

== Livery variations ==
- EF65 9: Repainted in early-style all-over brown livery with white ("JR貨物"; JR Freight) lettering on the side
- EF65 57: Repainted in early-style all-over brown livery
- EF65 105: Repainted in Euroliner livery
- EF65 116: Repainted in blue with large yellow "JR" lettering on the sides and yellow bands on the cab ends
- EF65 123: Repainted in Yuyu Salon Okayama livery (initially maroon, later orange)
- EF65 1019: Repainted in Super Express Rainbow red livery in March 1987. Removed from service on 31 December 1997, and withdrawn on 1 September 1998.
- EF65 1059: Repainted in blue with yellow front-end warning panels and large "JR" logo in July 1987. Remained in this livery until withdrawal on 31 March 2009.
- EF65 1065: Experimental JR Freight livery
- EF65 1118: Super Express Rainbow livery
- EF65 1124: Twilight Express dark green and yellow livery from November 2015

== Gallery ==
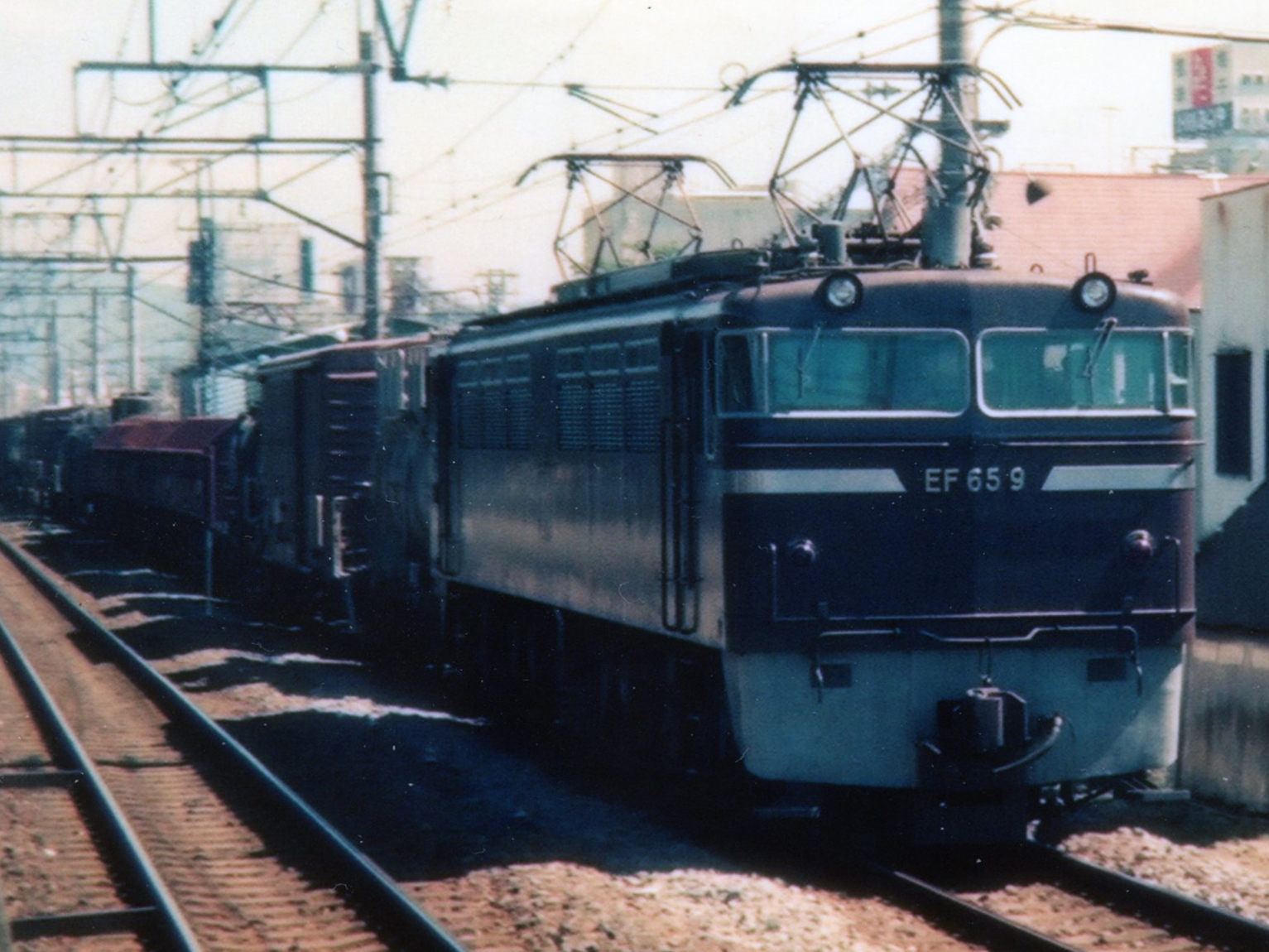
Brown-liveried JR Freight EF65 9 in 1989

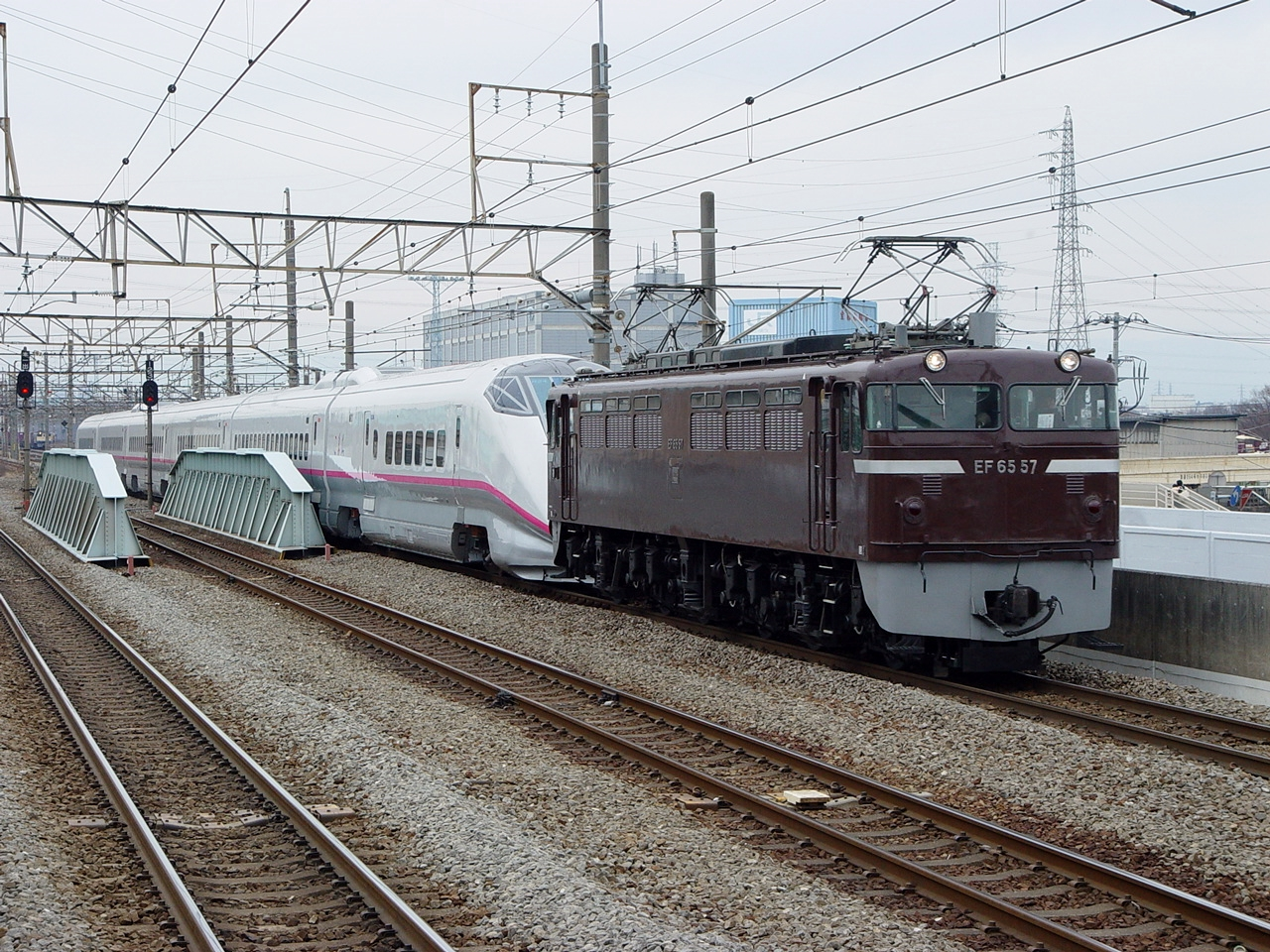
JR Freight EF65 57 specially repainted in early-style brown livery in March 2005

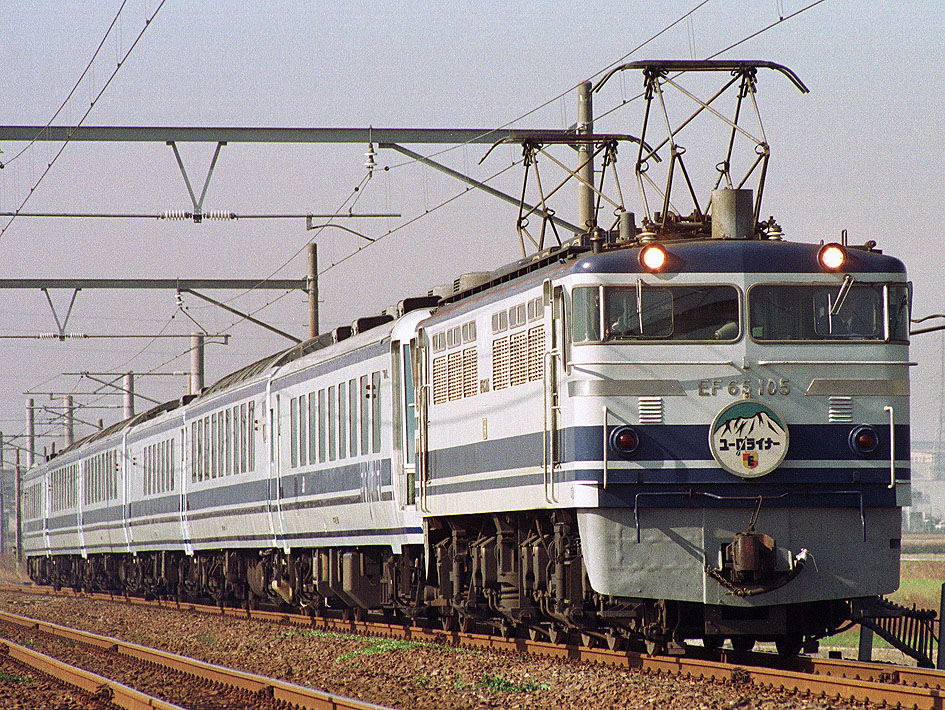
EF65 105 in Euroliner livery

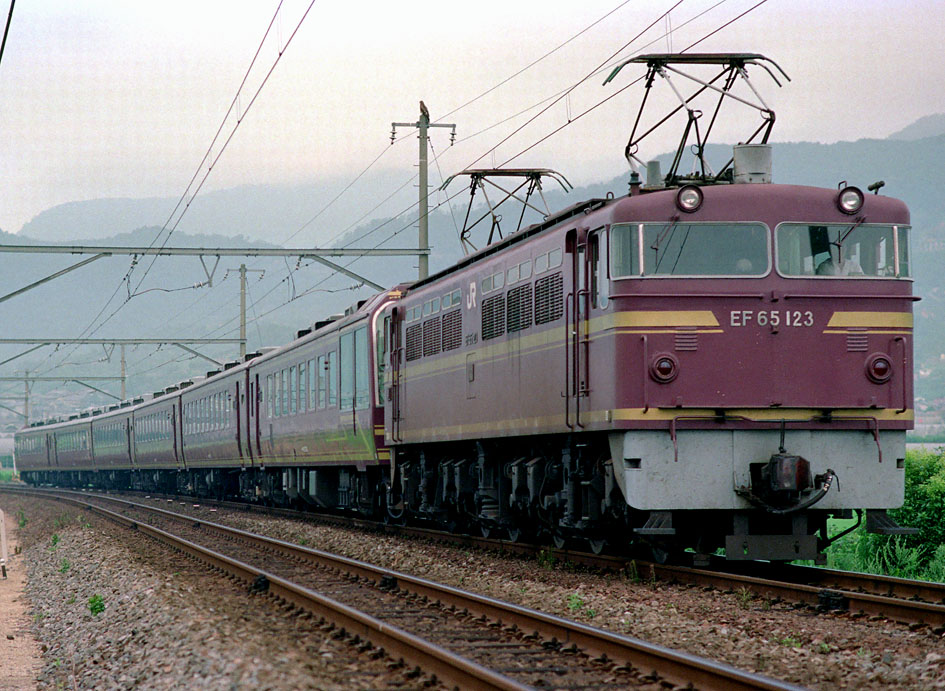
EF65 123 in original maroon Yuyu Salon Okayama livery

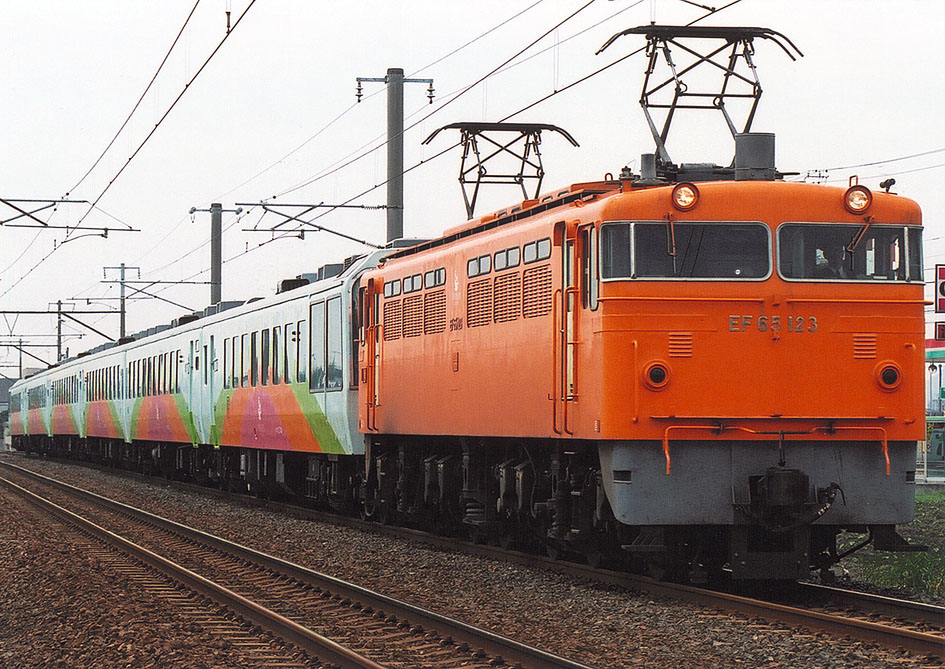
EF65 123 in later orange Yuyu Salon Okayama livery

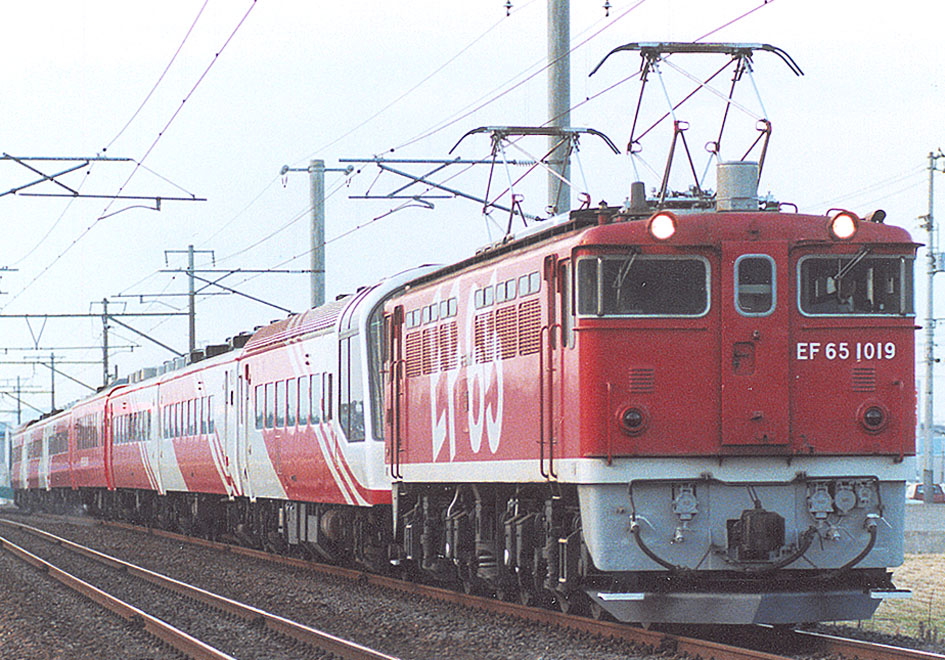
EF65 1019 in Super Express Rainbow livery

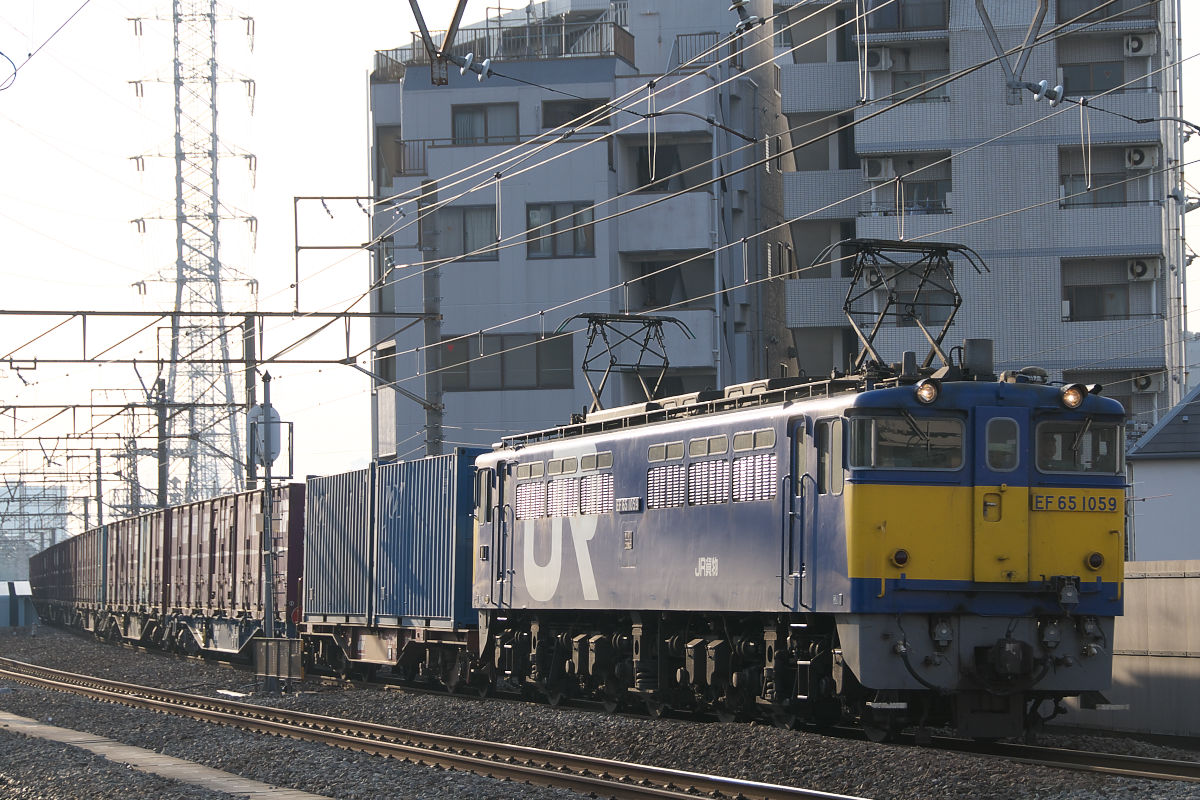
EF65 1059 in experimental JR Freight livery

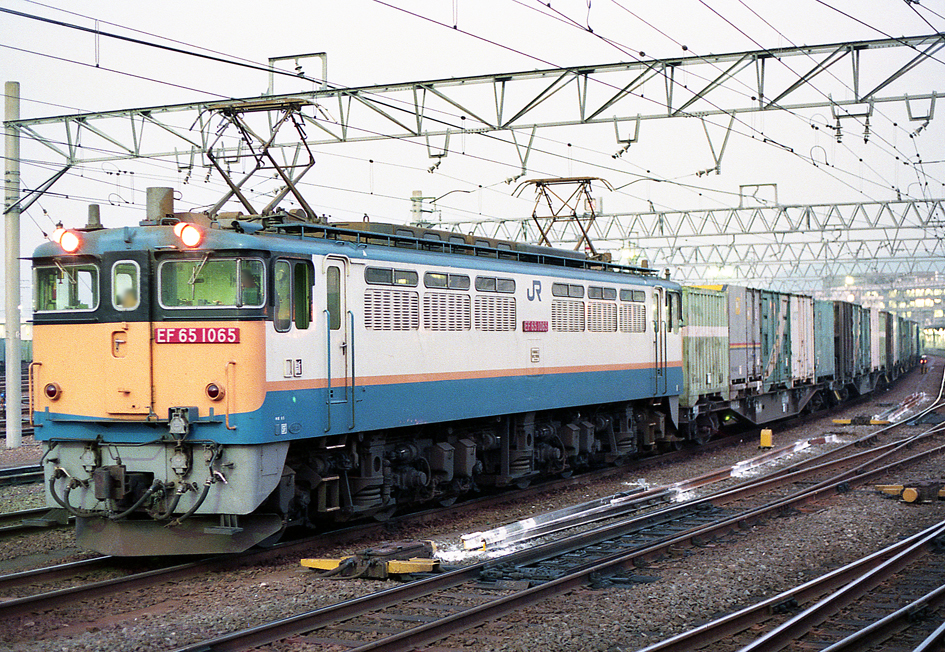
EF65 1065 in experimental JR Freight livery

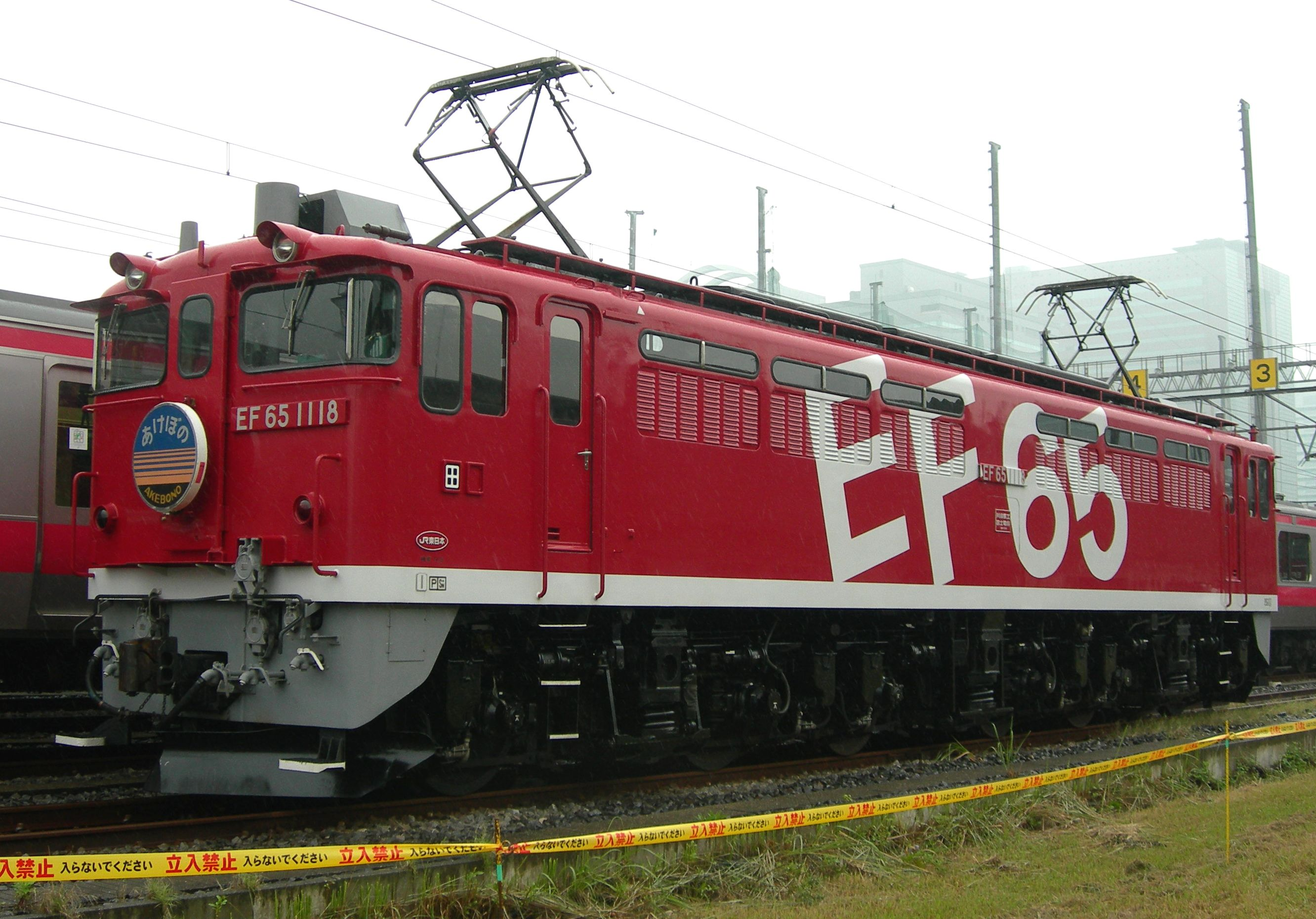
JR East Super Express Rainbow liveried EF65 1118 in October 2010

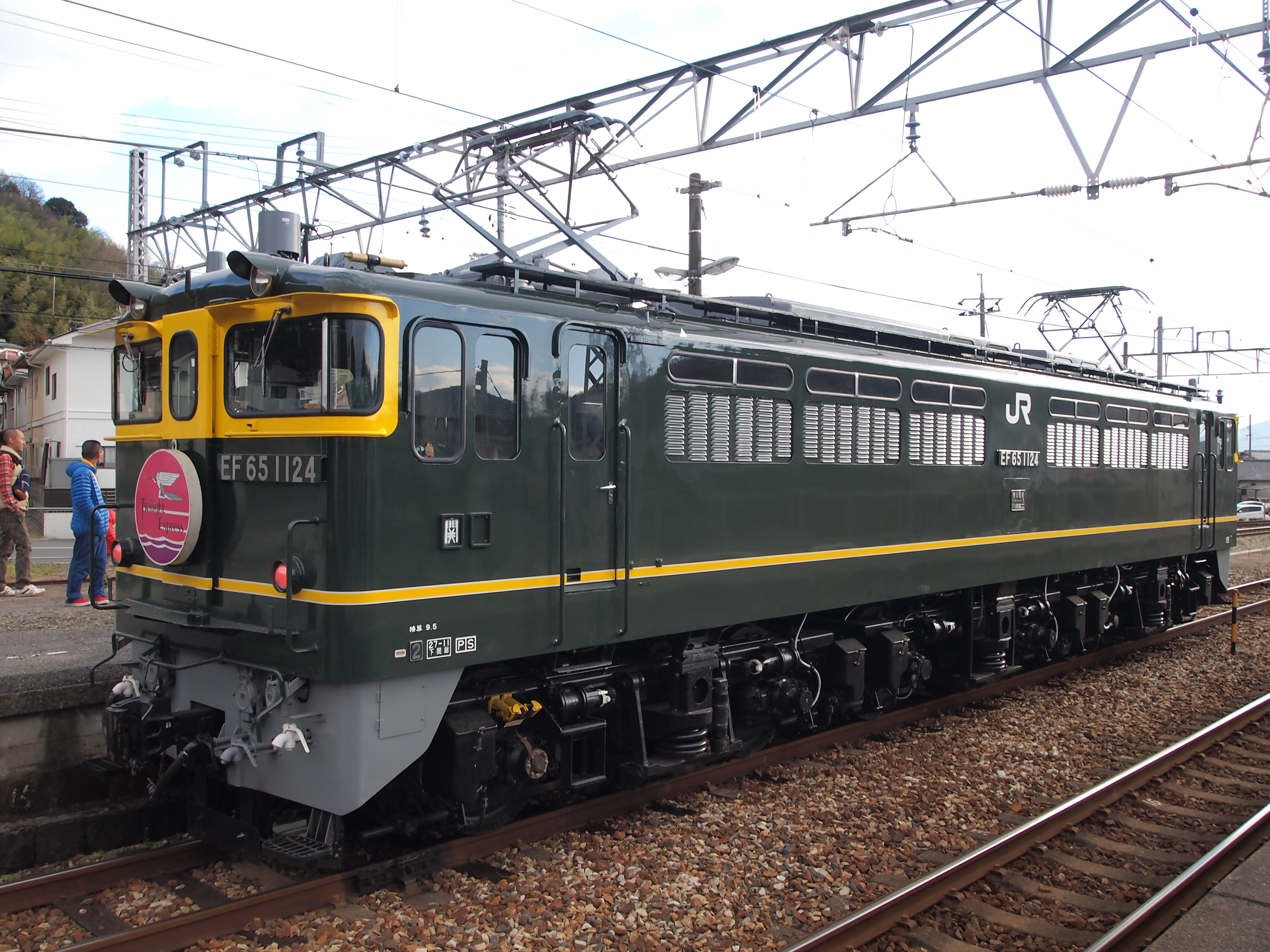
JR West EF65 1124 in Twilight Express livery in December 2015

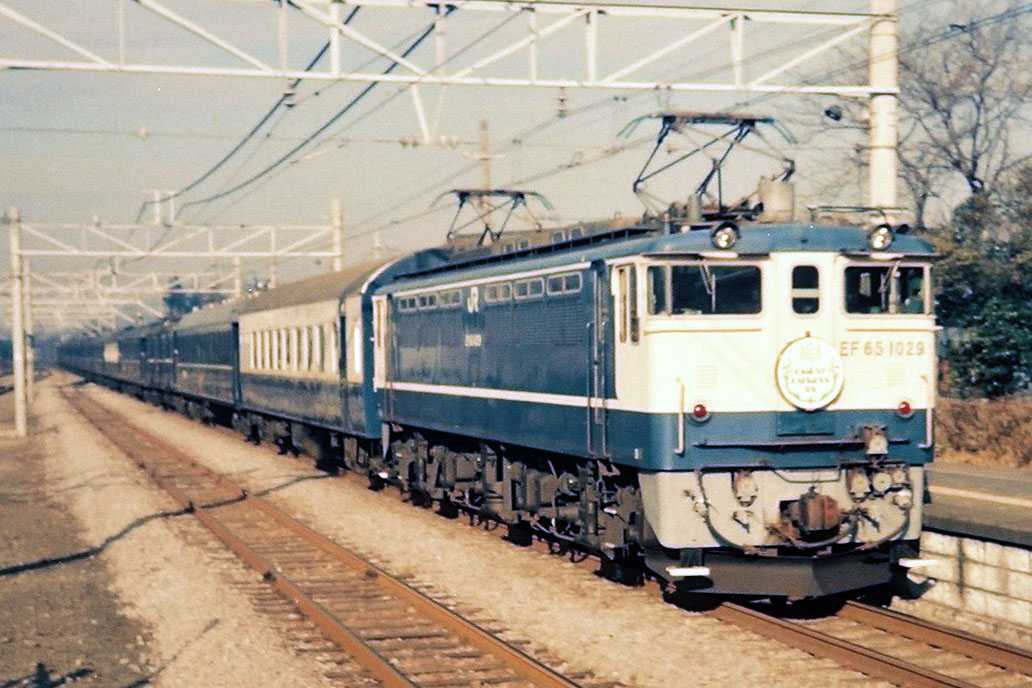
JR East EF65 1029 pulling the Orient Express '88 past Shinmachi Station in late 1988

== Preserved examples ==
- EF65 1: Preserved at the Kyoto Railway Museum in Kyoto.
- EF65 5: JR Freight Ōi Depot in Shinagawa, Tokyo (training use)
- EF65 520: Usui Pass Railway Heritage Park, Gunma Prefecture
- EF65 535: Originally stored at Ōmiya Works, Saitama Prefecture, and donated to Toshiba in Fuchu, Tokyo in March 2013
- EF65 536: Sekisui Kinzoku factory, Saitama Prefecture (cab only)
- EF65 539: Privately preserved in Gunma Prefecture (cab only)
- EF65 1001: JR Freight Ōi Depot in Shinagawa, Tokyo (training use)
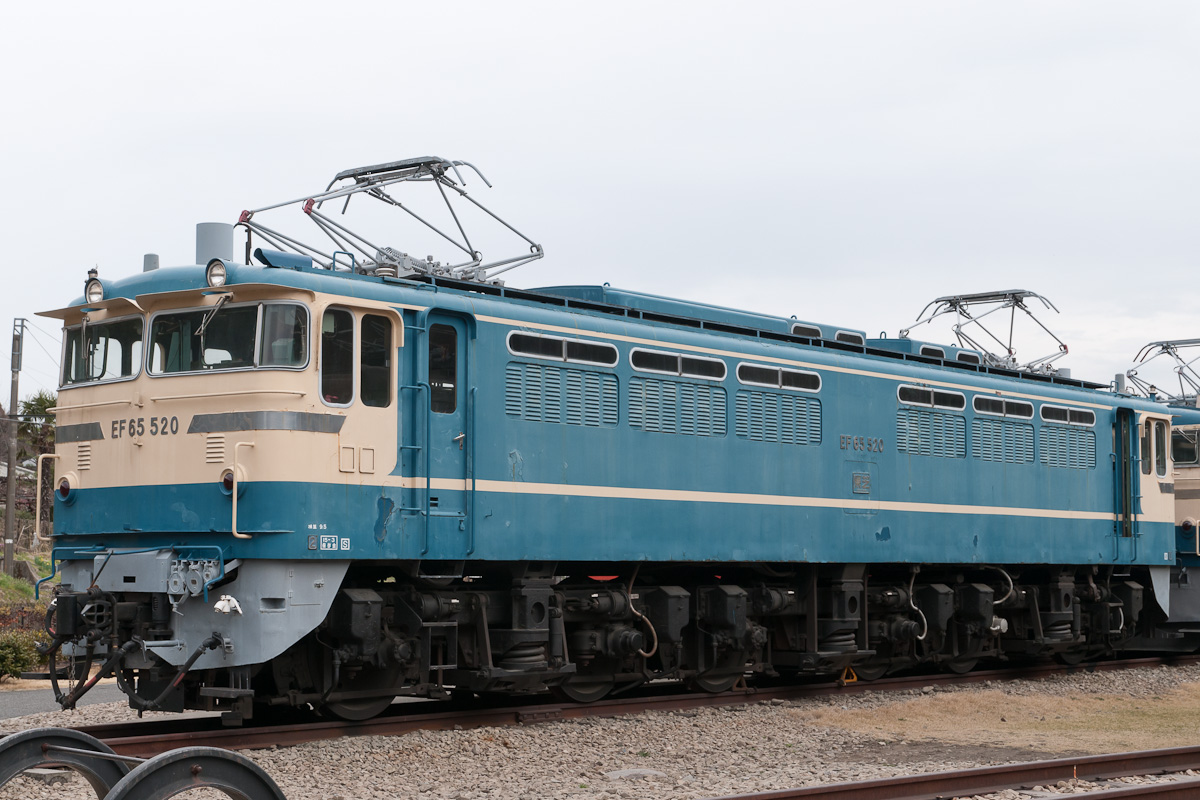
EF65 520 at the Usui Pass Railway Heritage Park in April 2011

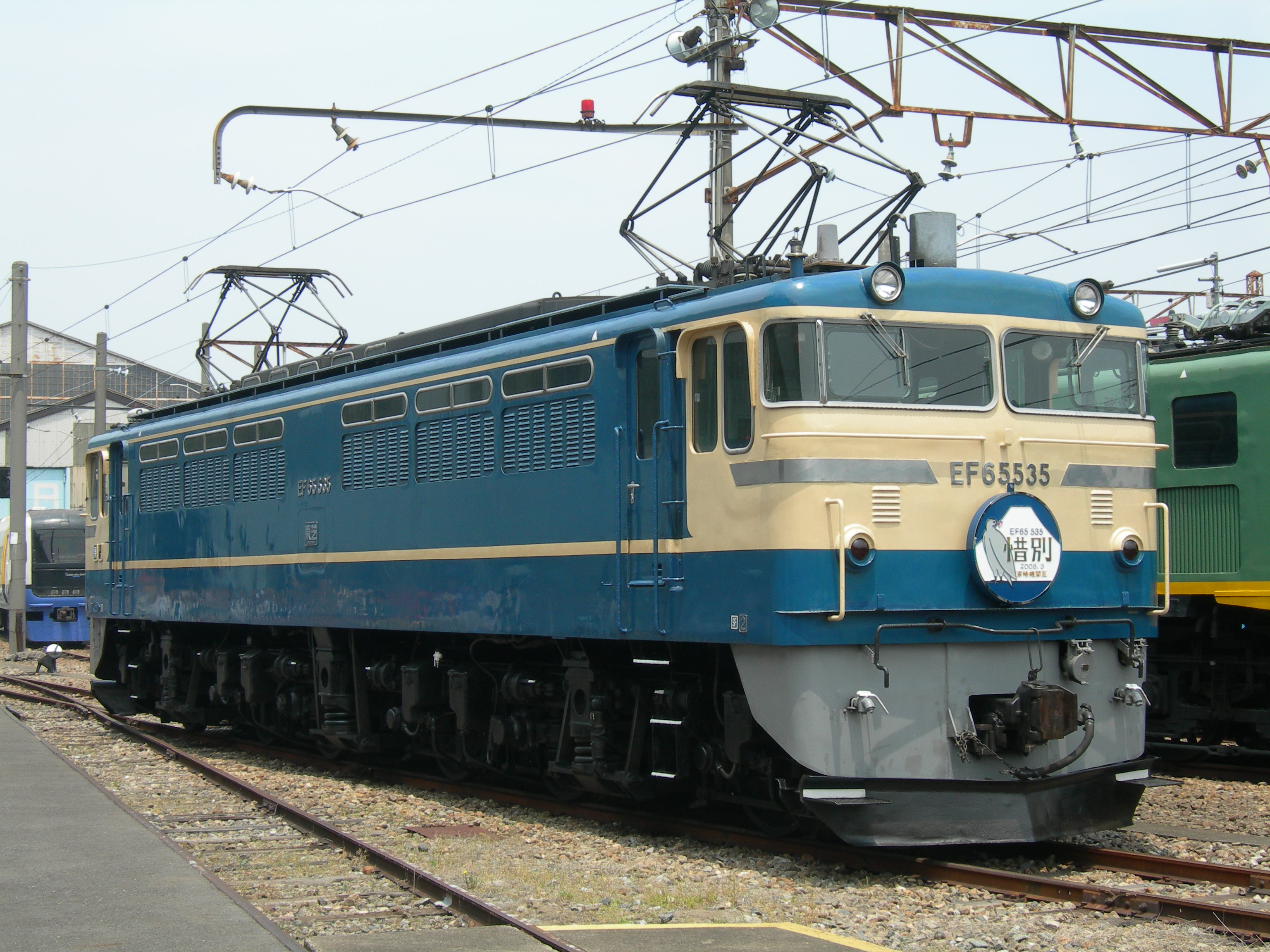
EF65 535 at Omiya Works in May 2008

== See also ==
- Japan Railways locomotive numbering and classification
- Railway electrification in Japan
