= Ginga (train) =

Japanese overnight sleeper train service (1949–2008)

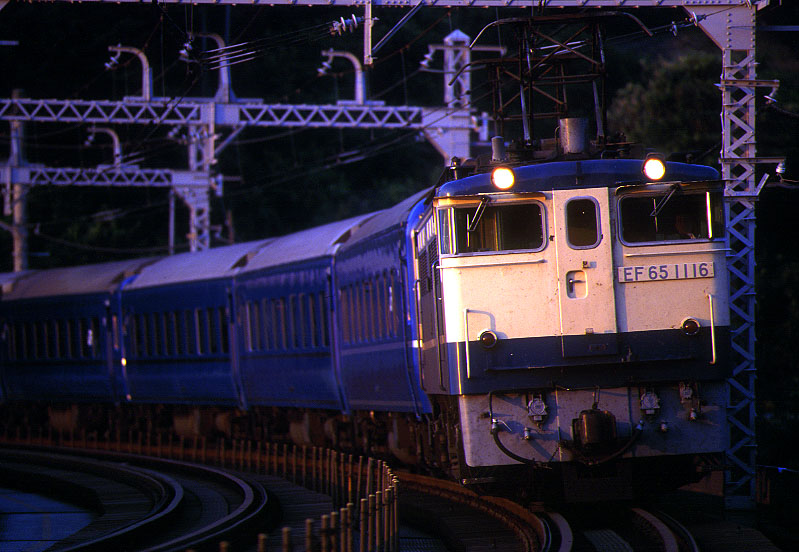
- Ginga train headed by an EF65 locomotive, August 2008

Overview
- Service type: Express
- Locale: Japan
- First service: 1949
- Last service: 2008
- Successor: West Express Ginga
- Former operators: JNR, JR West

Route
- Termini: Tokyo; Osaka

On-board services
- Seating arrangements: None
- Sleeping arrangements: Compartments
- Catering facilities: None

Technical
- Rolling stock: 24 series coaches
- Track gauge: 1,067 mm (3 ft 6 in)

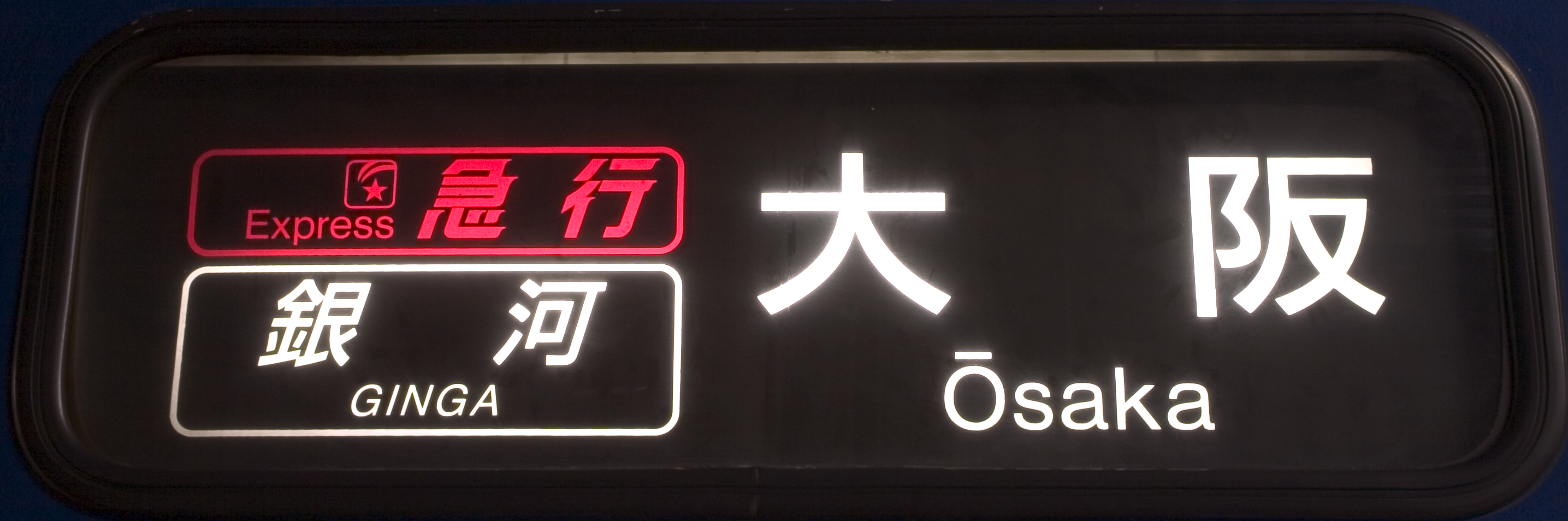
Signage of Osaka-bound service

The Ginga (銀河) was an overnight express sleeper train operating on the Tōkaidō Main Line between Tokyo Station and Osaka Station in Japan. It was initially operated by Japanese National Railways (JNR) and, after its privatization in 1987, by West Japan Railway Company (JR West).

The Ginga followed a similar route to the much faster Tōkaidō Shinkansen high-speed line, and filled the overnight gap in the Shinkansen's timetable. While the last Osaka-Tokyo Shinkansen trains departed at 21:20 (in either direction, as of 2008), Ginga departed Osaka at 22:30 and Tokyo at 23:00, and arrived over an hour before the first Shinkansen arrival the next morning. This made it somewhat popular among business travelers who needed a later departure or earlier arrival than the Shinkansen could provide.

However, the numerous overnight buses on the Tokyo-Osaka route largely captured the budget traveler market, while late evening and early morning flights to Kansai Airport (which opened in 1994 and does not have the noise restrictions facing Osaka Airport) were now used by many business travelers who would otherwise have used Ginga. As a result, Ginga's ridership fell dramatically and finally the train was discontinued upon the 15 March 2008 timetable revision.

On 12 September 2020, JR West introduced a new overnight express sleeper using the Ginga name, the West Express Ginga.

== Rolling stock ==
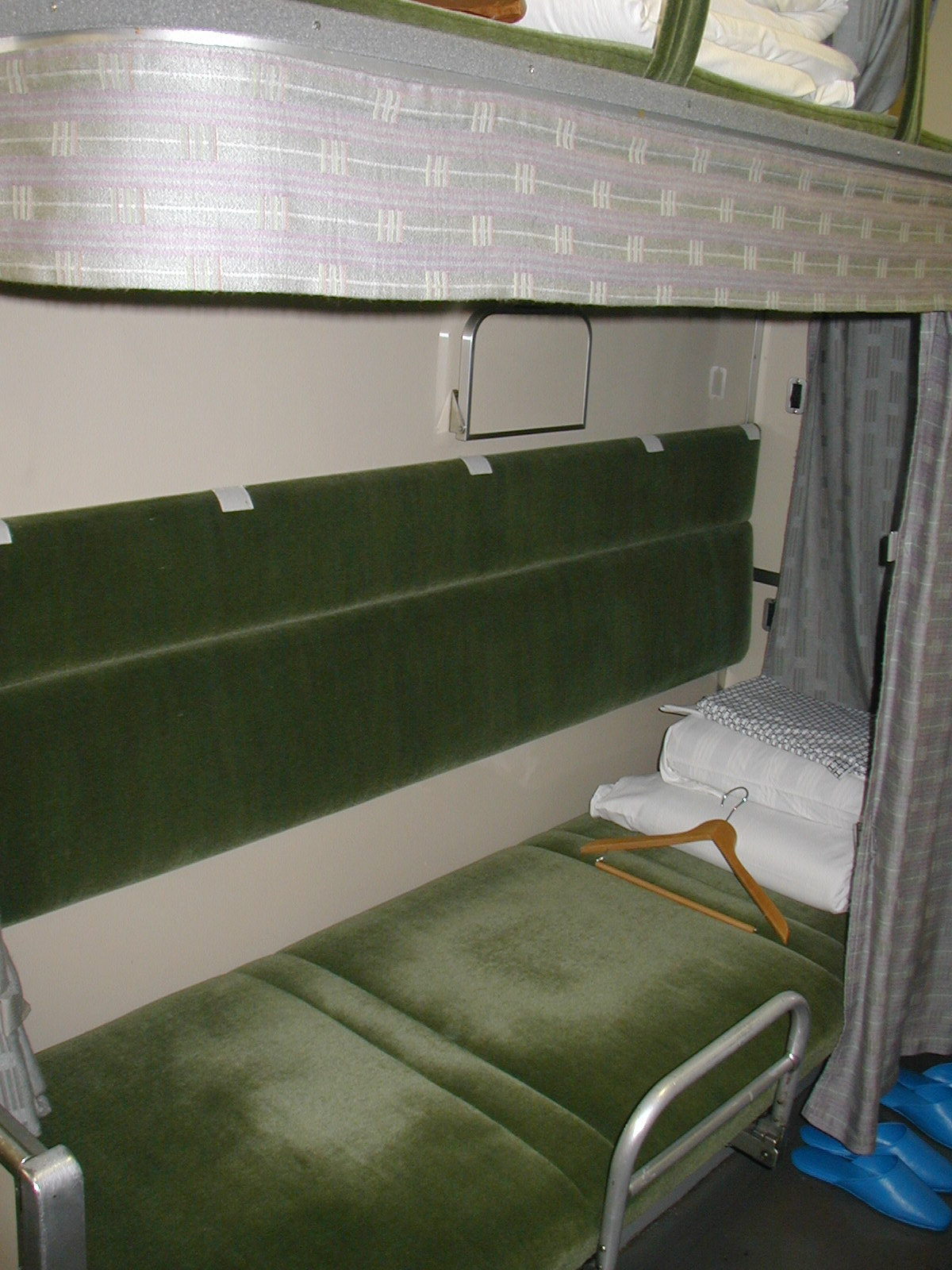
B-class sleeper berth

Ginga trains in 2008 consisted of an EF65-1000 electric locomotive, one "A-class" (first class) sleeper car, and seven "B-class" (second-class) sleeper cars. 24 series sleeping cars were used on this train.

== Stations ==
The westbound Ginga (train No. 101) stopped at Tokyo, Shinagawa, Yokohama, Ōfuna, Odawara, Atami, Shizuoka, Gifu, Maibara, Ōtsu, Kyōto, Shin-Ōsaka and Ōsaka.

The eastbound Ginga (train No. 102) stopped at Osaka, Shin-Osaka, Kyoto, Ōtsu, Maibara, Nagoya, Fuji, Numazu, Atami, Odawara, Ōfuna, Yokohama, Shinagawa, and Tokyo.

== History ==
The name "Ginga" was first carried from the start of the 15 September 1949 timetable revision by the overnight sleeper train departing from Tokyo at 20:30 to Osaka (arriving at 07:54) and the opposite working from Osaka (21:00) to Tokyo (07:30). Other overnight trains between Tokyo and Osaka were named Myōjō and Ryūsei. Initially formed of first and second class cars only, third class seating cars were added to the Ginga formation from 24 September the same year.

=== 11 November 1953 timetable revision ===
With the completion of electrification to Inazawa, overnight trains between Tokyo and Osaka were increased to four return workings nightly: Myōjō, Ginga, Suisei, and Gekkō. From this date, the Ginga operated from Tokyo (20:30) to Kobe (08:25), with the opposite working from Kobe (20:10) to Tokyo (07:53). From 20 March 1956, third-class sleeping cars were included in the train formations.

=== 19 November 1956 timetable revision ===
With the completion of electrification on the Tōkaidō Main line, journey times were reduced, and the Ginga timings became Tokyo (21:00) to Kobe (08:20), with the opposite working from Kobe (21:10) to Tokyo (09:03).

=== 1 October 1957 timetable revision ===
This timetable revision saw the emergence of the Akatsuki limited express night train, and the Ginga timings became Tokyo (21:00) to Kobe (07:57), with the opposite working from Kobe (20:50) to Tokyo (08:02). Train formation was MaNi + MaRoNe40 + MaRoNe41 + SuRo54 x3 + NaHaNe10 x4 + SuHa x4 + OHaFu.

=== 1 October 1961 timetable revision ===
With an increase in daytime limited express trains between Tokyo and Osaka, the Ginga became all sleeping car accommodation from this timetable revision. Timings became Tokyo (20:40) to Kobe (07:45), with the opposite working from Kobe (20:40) to Tokyo (07:40).

=== 1 October 1968 timetable revision ===
This major timetable revision known as yon-san-tō saw the Ginga and Myōjō services combined to become Ginga 1 and Ginga 2. Timings for Ginga 1 were Tokyo (21:45) to Osaka (07:17), with the opposite working from Osaka (21:30) to Tokyo (07:05). Timings for Ginga 2 were Tokyo (22:40) to Himeji (09:29), with the opposite working from Himeji (21:05) to Tokyo (09:39).

=== 10 March 1975 timetable revision ===
With the completion of the Sanyo Shinkansen, the Ginga 1 and Ginga 2. services were cut back to one return working between Tokyo and Osaka. Timings were Tokyo (22:45) to Osaka (08:00), with the opposite working from Osaka (23:10) to Tokyo (09:36).

=== Rolling stock upgrades ===
From 20 February 1976, the ageing rolling stock was replaced by more modern 20 series "Blue Train" sleeping cars cascaded from the Tsurugi service between Osaka and Niigata, which had been upgraded to 24 series sleeping cars. Haulage was by JNR Class EF58 electric locomotives until September 1980, when these were replaced by JNR Class EF65 locomotives.

From 14 March 1985, the Ginga 20 series rolling stock was replaced by 14 series sleeping cars displaced by the use of 583 series EMUs on Kitaguni services. The following year, from the 1 November 1986 timetable revision, the 14 series rolling stock was replaced by 24/25 series sleeping cars.
