= British Rail Class 28 =

Class of diesel electric locomotives built by Metropolitan Vickers

Metropolitan Vickers Type 2, British Rail Class 28
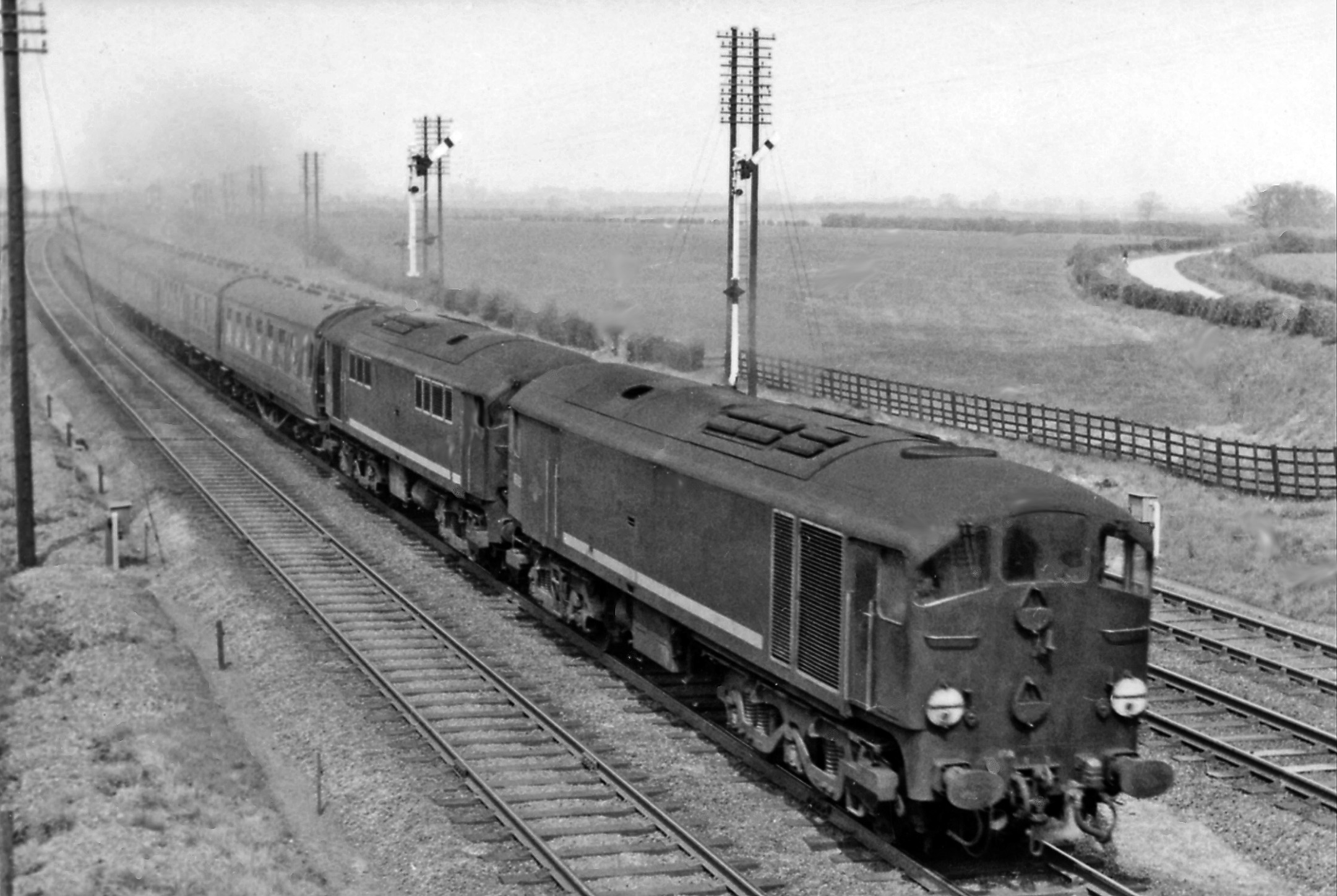
- Two 'Metrovicks' Nos. D5703 & D5710 passing Millbrook, Bedfordshire in 1960
Type and origin
- Power type: Diesel-electric
- Builder: Metropolitan-Vickers’ Bowesfield Works, Stockton-on-Tees.
- Build date: 1958–1959
- Total produced: 20
Specifications
- Configuration
  - UIC: Co'Bo'
  - Commonwealth: Co-Bo
- Gauge: 4 ft 8 1/2 in (1,435 mm) standard gauge
- Wheel diameter: 3 ft 3 1/2 in (1.003 m)
- Minimum curve: 3.5 chains (70 m)
- Wheelbase: 42 ft 9 in (13.03 m)
- Length: 56 ft 7 1/2 in (17.26 m)
- Width: 8 ft 6 in (2.59 m)
- Height: 12 ft 1 1/2 in (3.70 m)
- Loco weight: 97 long tons (98.6 t; 109 short tons)
- Fuel capacity: 510 imp gal (2,300 L; 610 US gal)
- Prime mover: Crossley HST V8
- Generator: DC
- Traction motors: 5 × Metropolitan-Vickers 137BZ, DC
- Transmission: Diesel electric
- MU working: ● Red Circle
- Train heating: Spanner steam generator of 1,500 lb/h (680 kg/h)
- Train brakes: Vacuum
Performance figures
- Maximum speed: 75 mph (121 km/h)
- Power output: Engine: 1,200 hp (895 kW)
- Tractive effort: Maximum: 50,000 lbf (222 kN)
Career
- Operators: British Railways
- Numbers: D5700–D5719
- Axle load class: Route availability 6
- Retired: December 1967 – September 1968
- Disposition: One preserved, remainder scrapped

The British Rail Class 28 (Metropolitan Vickers Type 2) diesel-electric locomotives, known variously as 'Metrovicks', 'Crossleys' or 'Co-Bos', were built under the Pilot Scheme for diesel locomotives as part of the British Railways 1955 Modernisation Plan.

These Crossley-engined locomotives were one of two designs built under the Pilot Scheme to use two-stroke diesel engines, the other being the Class 23 'Baby Deltic' locomotives. (Note: The DP1 and Class 55 locomotives with their Deltic engines were not built under the Pilot Scheme.)

The locomotives had a Co-Bo wheel arrangement (a 6-wheel bogie at one end, a 4-wheel bogie at the other) – unique in British Railways practice and uncommon in other countries, although Japan also used some C-B diesel hydraulics. The maximum tractive effort of 50,000 lbf (220 kN) was unusually high for a Type 2 locomotive but, as there were five (not four) driving axles, the risk of wheelslip was minimal.

== Origin ==
Work had begun on the Pilot Scheme in 1954 and the first plan for 174 locomotives (all classes) had been produced by October 1954, including 20 of these Metro-Vick Type B locos, although orders were not placed until November 1955. In July 1956 the Type A, B and C designations were changed to Types 1, 2 and 4, making this a Type 2. (Note: As a corollary of this, no Type 3 locomotives (1,500–2,000 bhp), such as the Class 37 or Class 35 Hymeks had been ordered under this initial Scheme.)

The two-stroke engine was chosen as a comparison to the more common four-stroke engines used, and partly as a result of the influence of Oliver Bulleid. The leading manufacturer of such two-stroke locomotive engines was General Motors, but the national shortage of foreign exchange meant that imported engines were unaffordable. Crossley in Manchester had a suitable design in production as a generator set for the Admiralty and had also used it for a class of locomotives in Australia. Although Bulleid had left British railways and moved to Ireland and the CIÉ, he had been impressed by the Admiralty's experience of the Crossley diesel and had already ordered 60 similar locomotives, as the CIÉ 001 Class.

== Engine ==
With low-speed Crossley 8-cylinder HST V8 two stroke engines, they represented an experiment in two stroke versus four stroke engines for diesel-electric traction.

The engines had exhaust pulse pressure charging and developed 1,200 horsepower (895 kW) at 625 rpm. There were no valves, and inlet and exhaust were via ports in the cylinder walls. The same engine was originally fitted in the Irish A Class and the Western Australian Government Railways X class. A similar, but smaller engine, the ESNT6 was used in the D3/3 shunters, an 08 with a Crossley engine rather than English-Electric.

Almost from the beginning, the Metrovick's Crossley engines were problematic. They suffered frequent failures and by 1961 the entire class was handed back to the manufacturer for remedial work on the engines and to cure problems with cab windows falling out while running. The cab windows were modified, such that instead of wrapping round to the side, the outer front windows were replaced by a flat piece of glass facing the front only.

The engines were also noisy and prone to unacceptable levels of smoky exhaust fumes.

== Statistics ==
Total weight in working order was 97 long tons, distributed as shown in the table below. The units are tons, hundredweights and quarters with metric conversion.

	No. 1 end (Co)			No. 2 end (Bo)		Total
In working order	18-17-0 (19.152 t)	19-14-2 (20.042 t)	19-13-1 (19.978 t)	19-4-0 (19.508 t)	19-14-2 (20.042 t)	97-3-1 (98.722 t)
Empty	18-0-2 (18.314 t)	18-4-0 (18.492 t)	18-2-3 (18.429 t)	18-0-0 (18.290 t)	18-4-0 (18.492)	90-11-1 (92.020 t)
Unsprung	3-13-1 (3.721 t)	3-13-1 (3.721 t)	3-13-1 (3.721 t)	3-15-2 (3.836 t)	3-15-2 (3.836 t)	18-10-3 (18.835 t)

== Operation ==
All twenty Metrovicks were initially allocated to the Midland Division of BR's London Midland Region, where they were often used in pairs on the overnight London–Glasgow "Condor" express freight service. They were also used in pairs to cover for failures and were recorded as taking the London–Glasgow sleeper, a notoriously heavy train, forwards from Carlisle without problems.

After refurbishment in 1961 they were all transferred to the Barrow-in-Furness 12E depot. They were withdrawn after only eleven years at work and in service. The allocation of all twenty locomotives in October 1967 was Carlisle Upperby.

Despite the electrical and mechanical equipment being reliable, the Crossley engines were still giving problems and British Rail considered replacing the engines, as was done with the Class 31 diesels and, later, with Crossley-engined locomotives in Ireland. A quotation was obtained by BR from English Electric for re-engining with an uprated version of the reliable 8SVT prime mover, already proven in the Class 20, and this was close to proceeding. However, the entire class, along with other small non-standard diesel classes, was withdrawn from service during 1967–68, and all but one were scrapped by the end of 1969. Their parts had been sold to make new metals by the end of 1971.

Table of withdrawals
Year	Quantity in service at start of year	Quantity withdrawn	Locomotive numbers	Notes
1967	20	6	D5700/03–04/09–10/13	
1968	14	14	D5701–02/05–08/11–12/14–19	D5705 went into departmental use

== Preservation ==
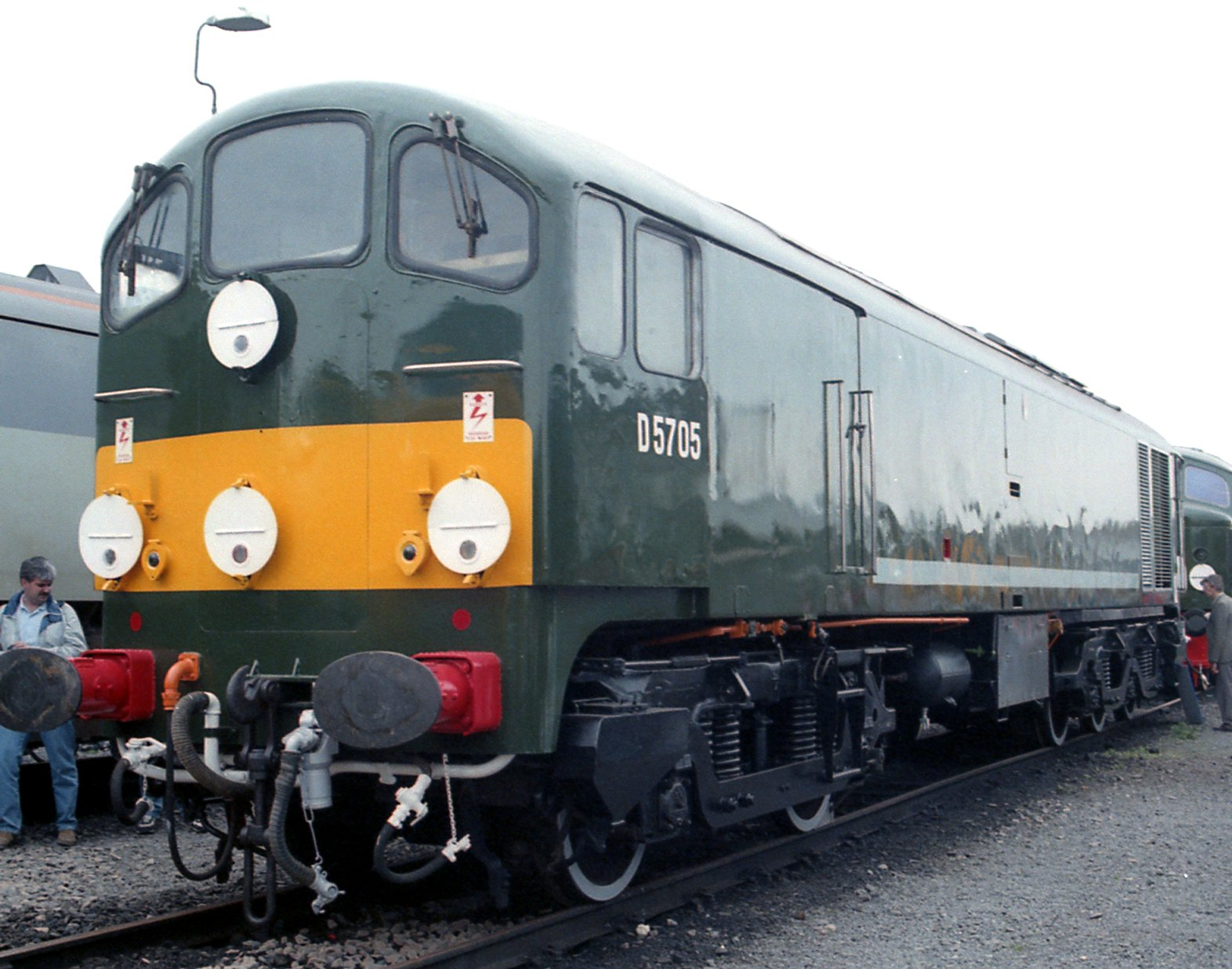
D5705 at Coalville depot open day, 1991

A single locomotive, D5705, survived by historical accident, being renumbered S15705 and used from December 1968 by the Research Division for its Tribometer Test Train. It was superseded by the sole surviving Class 23. It was then used as carriage heating unit TDB968006 (based at Bath Road Depot, Bristol) before being preserved in 1985. Prior to this, it spent several years in a semi-protected siding on the line from Gloucester, just outside Swindon Station. It is currently on the East Lancashire Railway. The Class 15 Preservation Society has signed an agreement with the owners of D5705 to become its custodians during its restoration and operation for the next ten years, although funding will remain separate.

== In fiction ==
The Class 28 is the basis for BoCo, a character in The Railway Series children's books by the Rev. W. Awdry and the spin-off TV series Thomas and Friends. He carries the number D5702.

== Models ==
The Class 28 has been made as a 00 gauge model in several forms, including a ready-to-run version by Hornby Dublo. A ready to run model is being produced by Heljan on behalf of and exclusive to Hatton's Model Railways in Liverpool. Following the closure of Hatton's in early 2024 their model railway toolings were sold to Rails of Sheffield. Heljan still produces the 1961 variant of the Class 28 now available exclusively through Rails. though this may change since the acquisition of Heljan by Accurascale in 2026. The Silver Fox Models model has now been withdrawn. As of November 2021, Rapido Trains UK have announced production of an N-scale model.

== See also ==
- EMD FL9, US contemporary of the Class 28, with B-A1A arrangement
- JNR Class DE10, a Japanese diesel-hydraulic with C-B arrangement
