= JNR Class DE11 =

Japanese diesel locomotive type

Class DE11
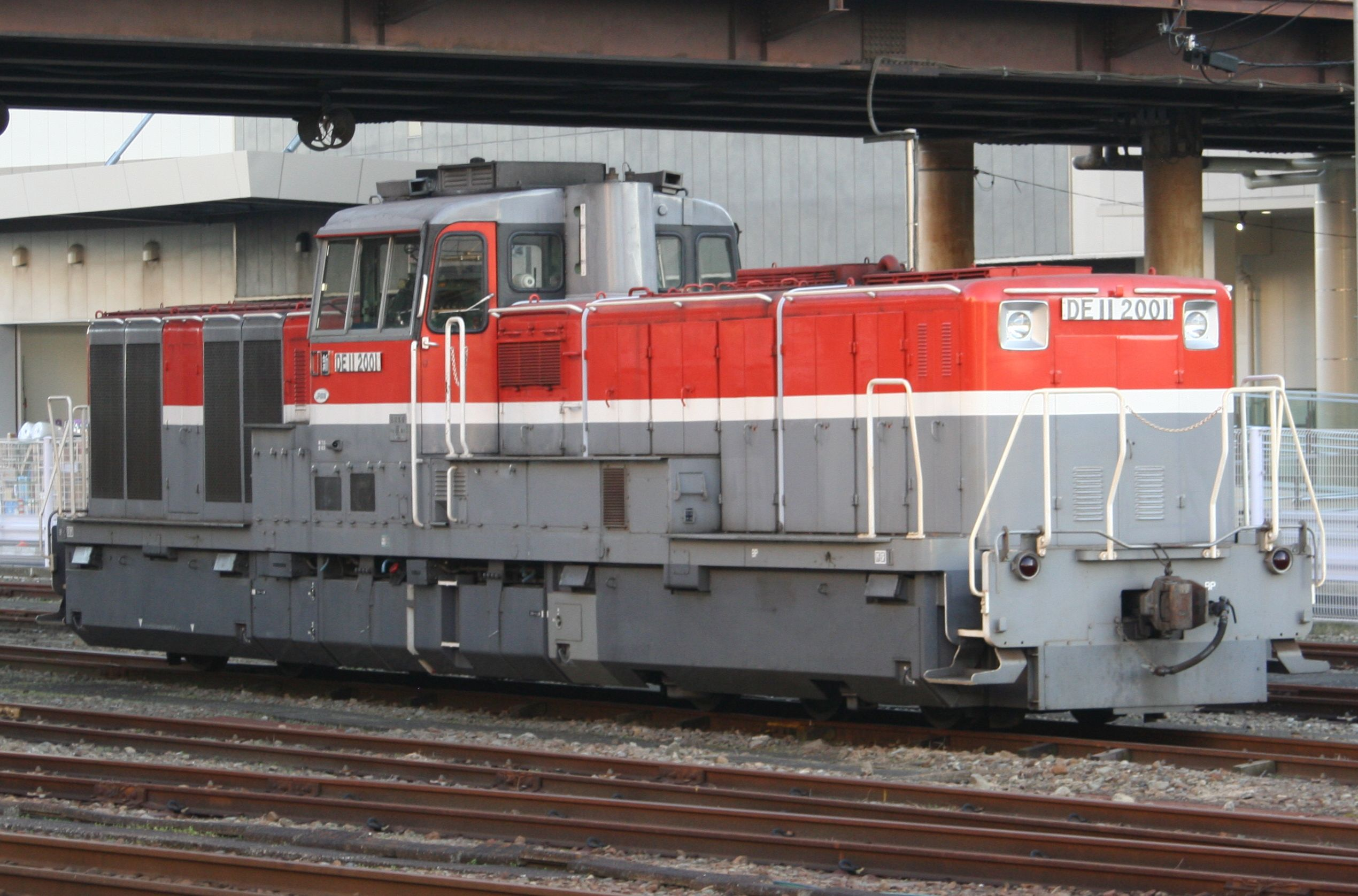
- JR Freight DE11 2001 in January 2011
Type and origin
- Power type: Diesel-hydraulic
- Builder: Kawasaki Heavy Industries, Nippon Sharyo
- Build date: 1968–1979
- Total produced: 116
Specifications
- Configuration
  - UIC: C-B
- Gauge: 1,067 mm (3 ft 6 in)
- Length: 14,150 mm (46 ft 5 in) (DE11-0/1000); 16,650 mm (54 ft 8 in) (DE11-2000)
- Width: 2,950 mm (9 ft 8 in)
- Height: 3,965 mm (13 ft 0.1 in)
- Axle load: 14 t (13.8 long tons; 15.4 short tons)
- Loco weight: 70 t (68.9 long tons; 77.2 short tons)
- Fuel type: Diesel
- Fuel capacity: 2,500 L (550 imp gal; 660 US gal)
- Engine type: DML61ZB
- Transmission: Hydraulic
- MU working: N/A
Performance figures
- Maximum speed: 85 km/h (55 mph)
- Power output: 1,250 hp (930 kW) (DE11-0); 1,350 hp (1,010 kW) (DE11-1000/2000)
- Tractive effort: 21,000 kgf (210,000 N; 46,000 lbf)
Career
- Operators: ■ JNR (1968-1987); ■ JR Freight (1987-); ■ JR East (1987-)
- Number in class: 10 (as of 1 April 2016)
- Disposition: In service

The Class DE11 (DE11形) is a five-axle C-B wheel arrangement diesel-hydraulic switcher locomotive type operated in Japan since 1968. A total of 116 locomotives were built between 1968 and 1979, and as of 1 April 2016, 10 locomotives remain in service, operated by East Japan Railway Company (JR East) and Japan Freight Railway Company (JR Freight).

== Variants ==
A total of 116 locomotives were built between 1968 and 1979, divided into the following sub-classes.

- Class DE11-0: 65 locomotives built between 1968 and 1970
- Class DE11-1000: 46 locomotives built between 1970 and 1974 with uprated engines
- Class DE11-1900: One locomotive built in 1975 with experimental noise-reduction features
- Class DE11-2000: 4 locomotives built in 1979 with noise-reduction features

== Design ==
The Class DE11 was developed from the Class DE10 locomotive design, with the train-heating steam generator and multiple-working equipment removed and replaced with concrete ballast weight to increase the axle load from 13 t to 14 t to improve adhesion for use in shunting work.

== History ==
=== DE11-0 ===
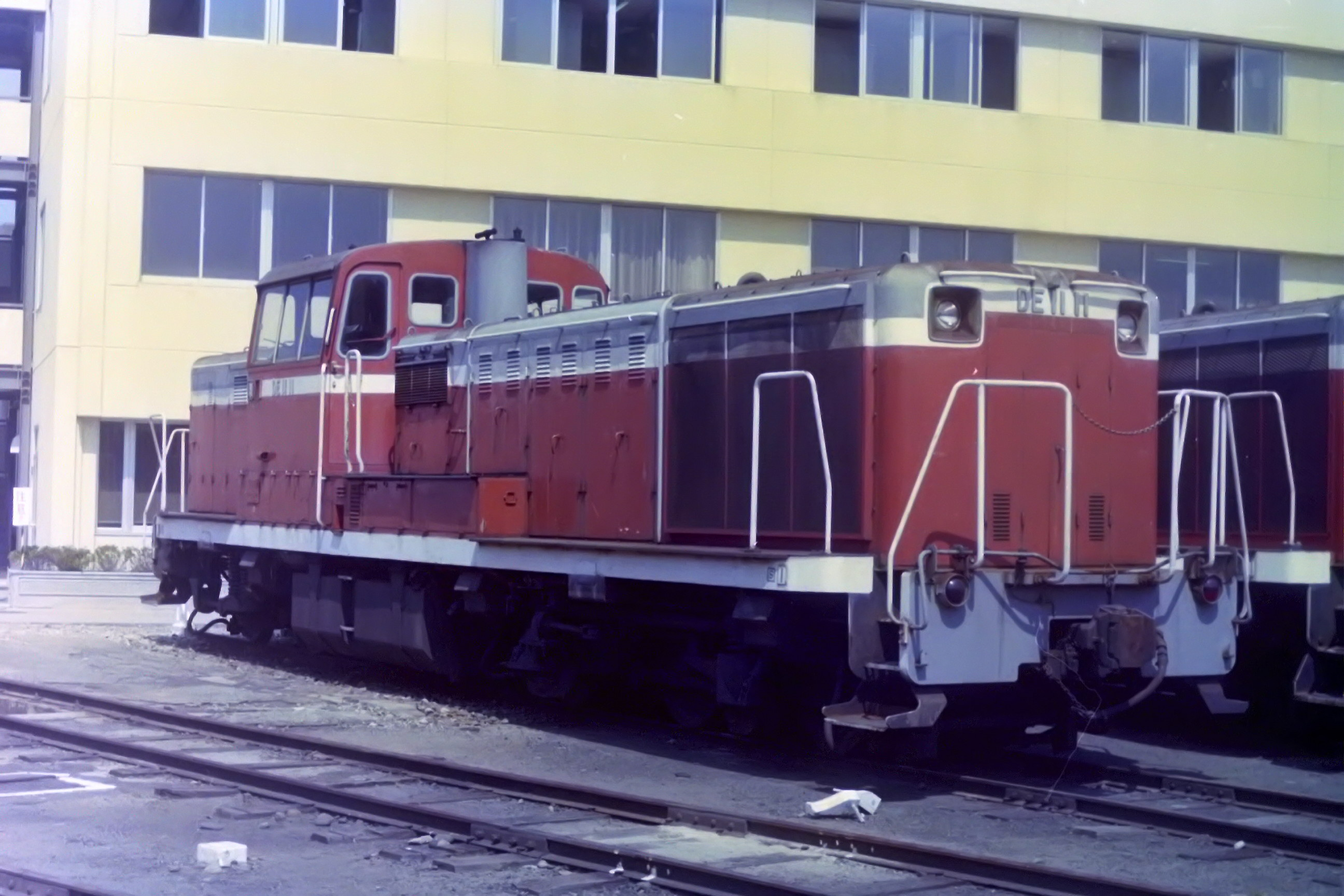
JNR DE11 11 in August 1985

65 locomotives were built between 1968 and 1970.

=== DE11-1000 ===
46 locomotives were built between 1970 and 1974 with their engines uprated from 1,250 hp (930 kW) to 1,350 hp (1,010 kW).

Locomotives DE11 1030, 1032, 1035, and 1046 were fitted with "SLC" (Shunting Locomotive Control) equipment to allow remote control at Musashino Marshalling Yard in Saitama Prefecture.

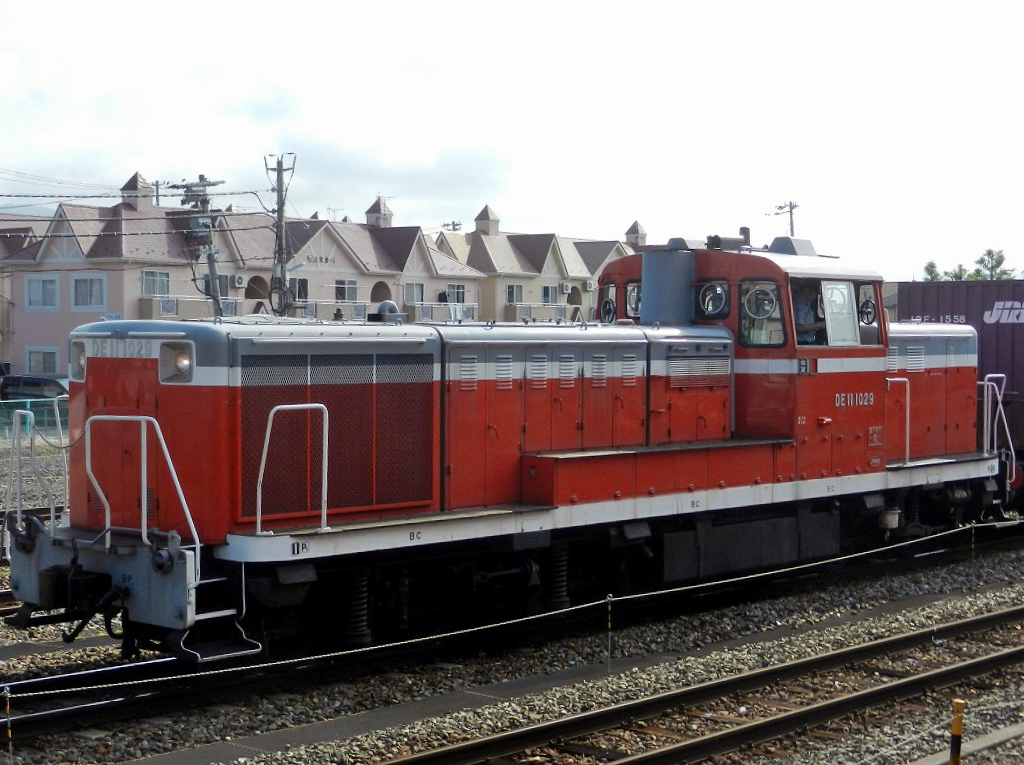
JR Freight DE11 1029 in July 2013

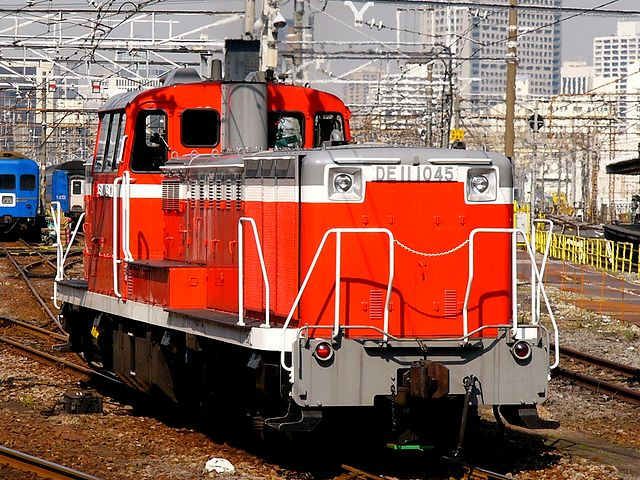
JR East DE11 1045 in February 2005

=== DE11-1900 ===
One locomotive, numbered DE11 1901, was built in 1975, experimentally incorporating a number of features to reduce external noise for use in yards close to residential areas. Features included additional sound-insulating around the engine compartment and a noise reduction unit on the exhaust stack.

DE11 1901 was withdrawn in 2000.

=== DE11-2000 ===
Four Class DE11-2000 locomotives, numbered DE11 2001 to 2004 were built in 1979, incorporating some of the noise-reduction features tried out on DE11 1901. These locomotives also feature skirting to reduce noise. The locomotive length was increased from 14,150 mm (46 ft 5 in) to 16,650 mm (54 ft 8 in).

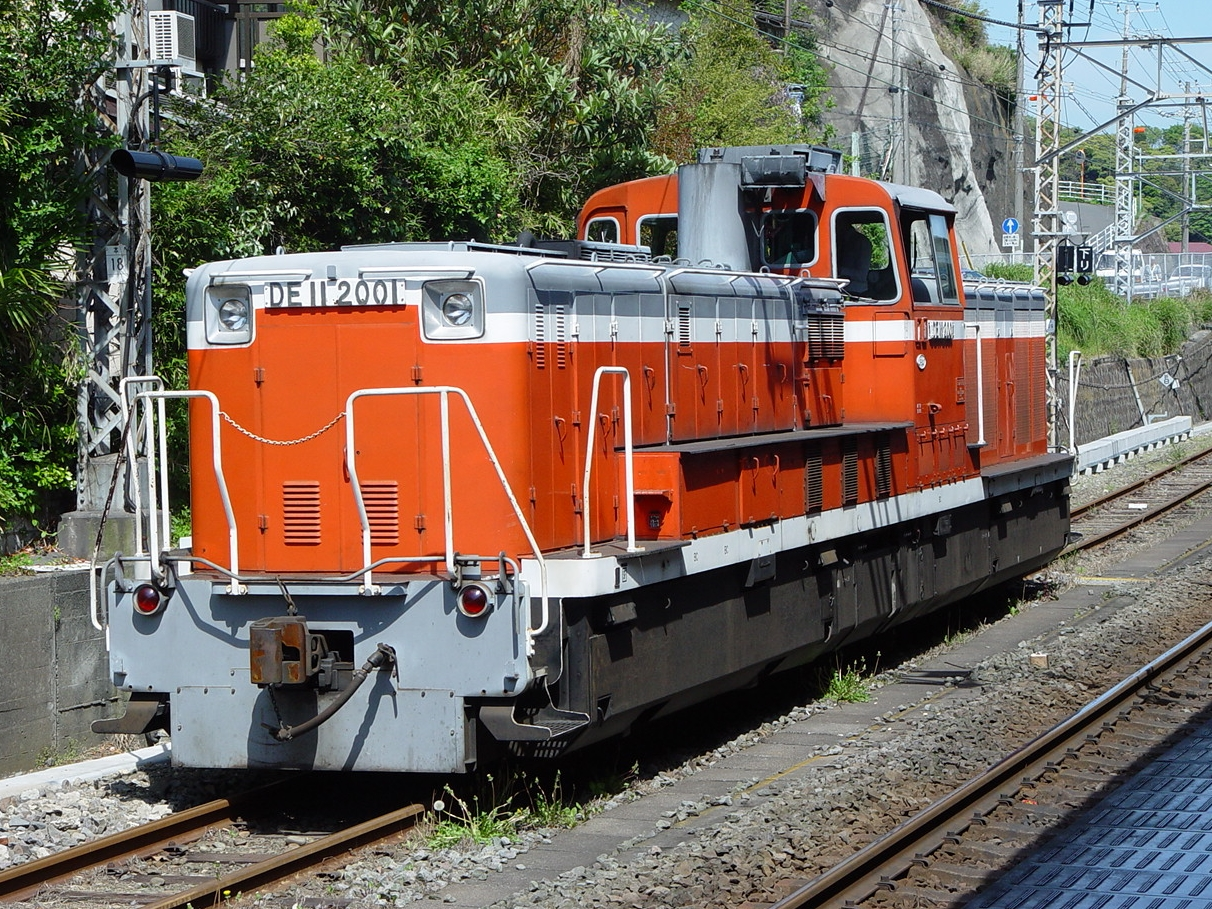
JR Freight DE11 2001 in April 2003, still in original JNR livery

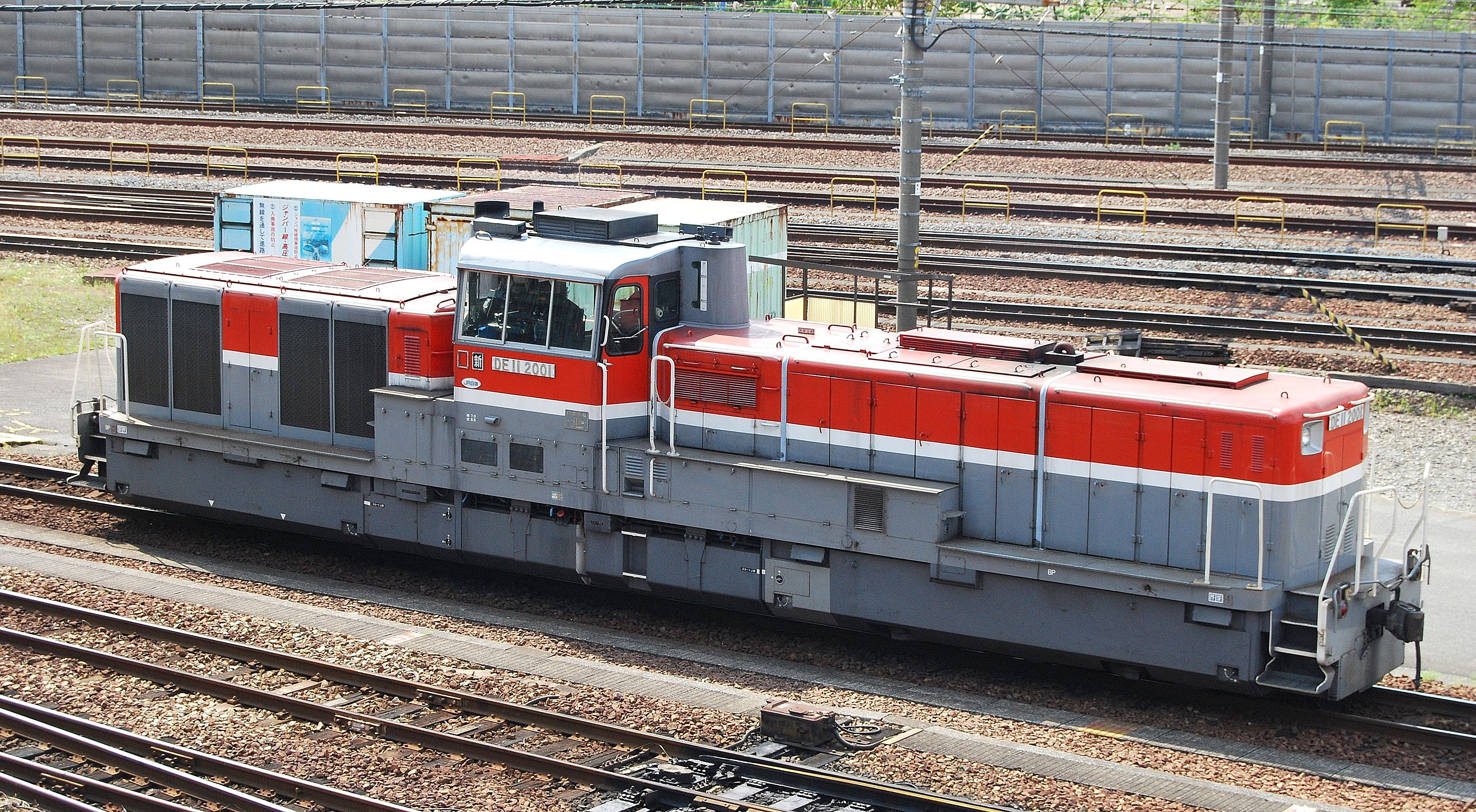
JR Freight DE11 2001 in JR Freight livery in April 2011 showing the noise-reduction skirting

== Fleet status ==
By 1 April 1995, 14 locomotives were still in service, with ten (nine DE11-1000 and DE11 1901) operated by East Japan Railway Company (JR East) and four (DE11-2000) operated by Japan Freight Railway Company (JR Freight)

As of 1 April 2016, 10 locomotives remain in service, with three (DE11-1000) operated by JR East and seven (three DE11-1000 and four DE11-2000) operated by JR Freight.

== Classification ==
The DE11 classification for this locomotive type is explained below.

- D: Diesel locomotive
- E: Five driving axles
- 11: Locomotive with maximum speed of 85 km/h or less
