= JNR Class DE15 =

Class of diesel locomotives operated in Japan

Class DE15
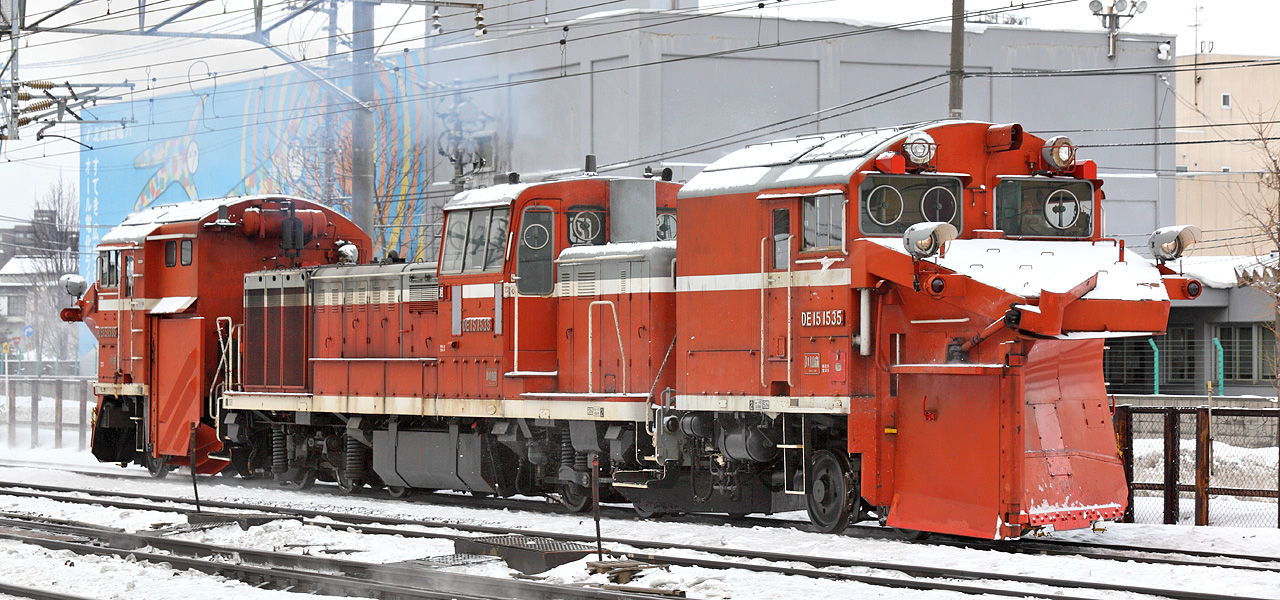
- JR Hokkaido DE15 1535 in February 2010
Type and origin
- Power type: Diesel-hydraulic
- Builder: Kawasaki Heavy Industries, Nippon Sharyo
- Build date: 1967–1981
- Total produced: 85
Specifications
- Configuration
  - UIC: C-B
- Gauge: 1,067 mm (3 ft 6 in)
- Length: 14,150 mm (46 ft 5 in) (locomotive only); 22,505 mm (73 ft 10.0 in) (with snowplough units); 27,760 mm (91 ft 1 in) (DE15-2500 with snowplough units)
- Width: 2,998 mm (9 ft 10.0 in)
- Height: 3,970 mm (13 ft 0 in)
- Loco weight: 65 t (64.0 long tons; 71.7 short tons)
- Fuel type: Diesel
- Fuel capacity: 2,500 L (550 imp gal; 660 US gal)
- Engine type: DML61ZB
- Transmission: Hydraulic
- Train heating: Steam heating boiler
Performance figures
- Maximum speed: 85 km/h (55 mph)
- Power output: 1,250 hp (930 kW) (DE15-0); 1,350 hp (1,010 kW) (DE15-1000 onward)
- Tractive effort: 19,500 kgf (191,000 N; 43,000 lbf)
Career
- Operators: ■ JNR (1967-1987); ■ JR Hokkaido (1987-); ■ JR East (1987-); ■ JR West (1987-)
- Number in class: 25 (as of 1 April 2016)
- Disposition: In service

The Class DE15 (DE15形) is a five-axle C-B wheel arrangement diesel-hydraulic locomotive type operated in Japan as a self-propelled snowplough unit since 1967 by the national railway company Japanese National Railways (JNR), and later by Hokkaido Railway Company (JR Hokkaido), East Japan Railway Company (JR East), and West Japan Railway Company (JR West). A total of 85 locomotives were built between 1967 and 1981, and as of 1 April 2016, 25 locomotives remain in service.

== Variants ==
A total of 85 locomotives were built between 1967 and 1981, divided into the following sub-classes.

- Class DE15-0
- Class DE15-1000
- Class DE15-1500
- Class DE15-2050
- Class DE15-2500
- Class DE15-2550

== Design ==
The Class DE15 was developed from the Class DE10 locomotive design, with the addition of separate two-axle snowplough units at either end. The snowplough units could be attached and detached relatively easily, allowing the locomotives to be used for shunting and other duties outside the winter periods, unlike the snowplough units on the earlier Class DD15 locomotives, which were mounted directly onto the locomotives and required a crane to be attached and detached.

== History ==
=== DE15-0 ===
Six Class DE15-0 locomotives were built between 1967 and 1969 by Kisha and Nippon Sharyo. The locomotives were based on the Class DE10-0 design and were equipped with a 1,250 hp (930 kW) engine and train-heating steam generator. Locomotive DE15 3 had a snowplough unit designed for clearing single-track lines, while the other five locomotives were designed for clearing double-track lines. Initially, the locomotives operated with only one snowplough unit, but locomotives DE15 1 to 3 and 6 were subsequently modified with snowplough units at both ends. DE15 3 was renumbered DE15 2053.

As of 1 April 2016, no Class DE15-0 locomotives remain in service.

=== DE15-1000 ===
Six Class DE15-1000 locomotives were built between 1971 and 1973 by Nippon Sharyo using the DML61ZB engine uprated to 1,350 hp (1,010 kW). Locomotive DE15 1002 had a snowplough unit designed for clearing single-track lines, while the other five locomotives were designed for clearing double-track lines. Initially, the locomotives operated with only one snowplough unit, but locomotives DE15 1002, 1004, and 1006 were subsequently modified with snowplough units at both ends. DE15 1002 was renumbered DE15 2052.

Type for clearing double-track lines, fitted with 1,350 hp (1,010 kW) engine and train-heating steam generator.

As of 1 April 2016, no Class DE15-1000 locomotives remain in service.

=== DE15-1500 ===
18 Class DE15-1500 locomotives were initially built, initially with a snowplough unit at only one end. Locomotives DE15 1501 to 1504, 1507, 1509 to 1512, 1514 to 1516, and 1518 were designed for clearing double-track lines, while the others were designed for single-track lines. Like the DE15-1000, these locomotives were equipped with a 1,350 hp (1,010 kW) engine, but had no train-heating steam generator.

From 1976, a further batch of locomotives was built by Kawasaki Heavy Industries and Nippon Sharyo with snowplough units at both ends and designed for clearing double-track lines.

As of 1 April 2016, 15 Class DE15-1500 locomotives remain in service, operated by JR Hokkaido (nine locomotives), JR East (two locomotive), and JR West (four locomotive).

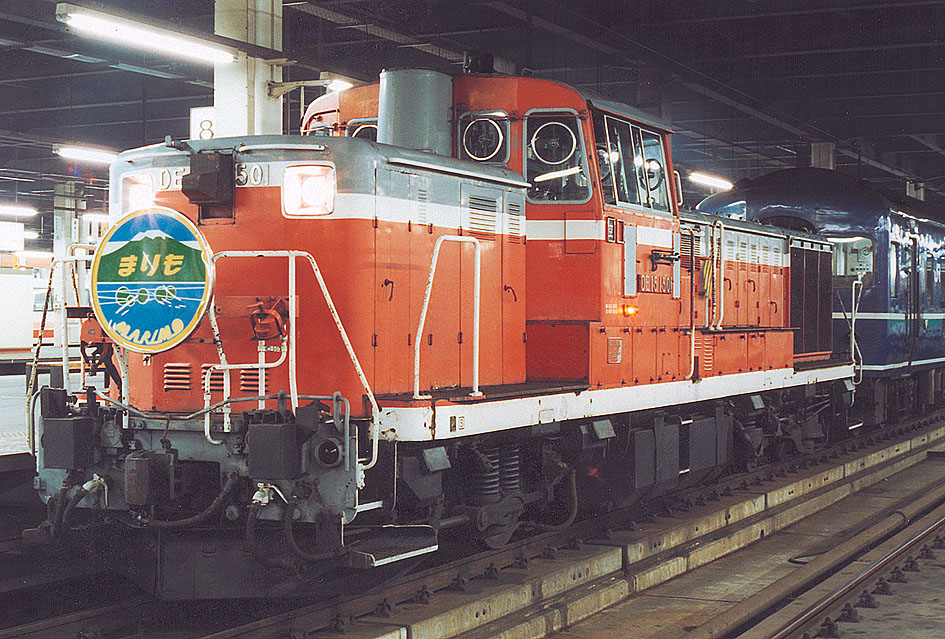
JR Hokkaido DE15 1501 hauling a Marimo service

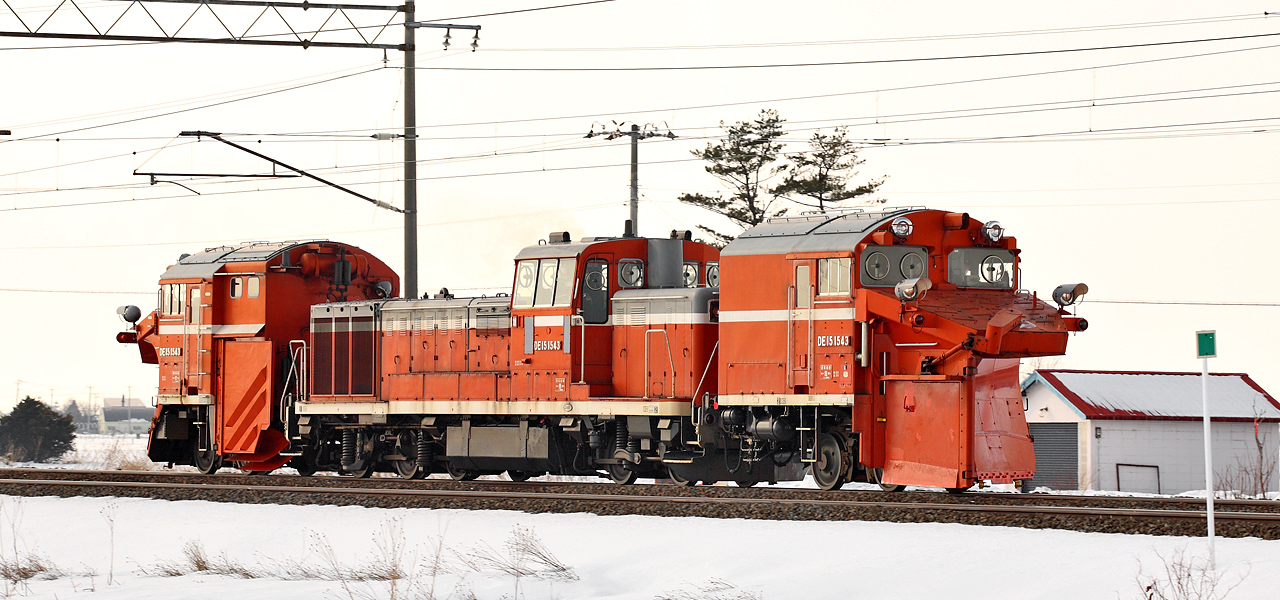
JR Hokkaido DE15 1543 in January 2009 with snowplough units attached

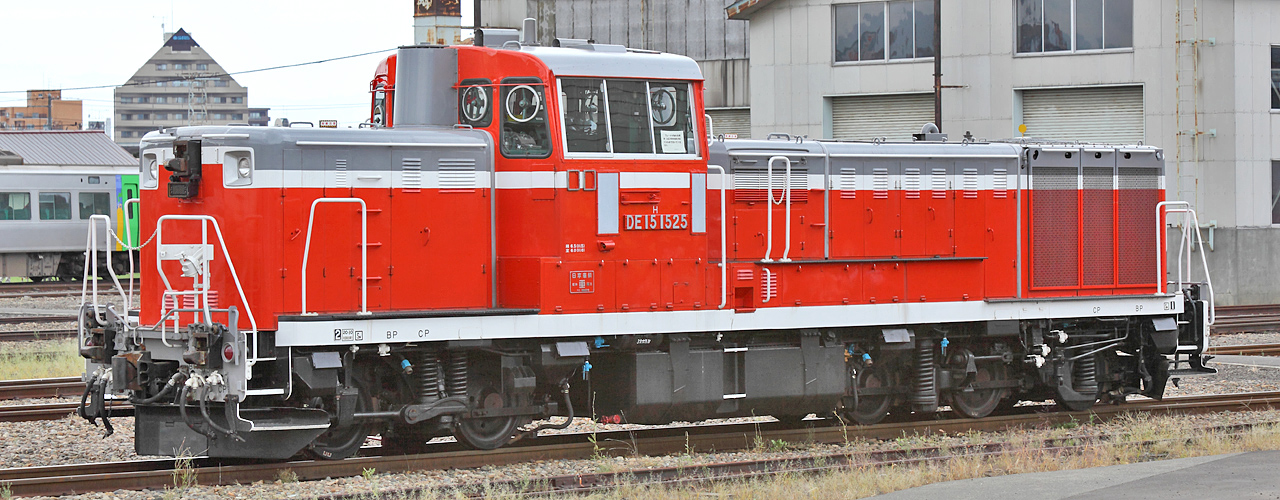
JR Hokkaido DE15 1525 in September 2010 with its snowplough units removed

=== DE15-2050 ===
This subclass consisted of two locomotives for clearing single-track lines. DE15 2052 was converted from DE15 1002 and was fitted with a 1,350 hp (1,010 kW) engine, while DE15 2053 was converted from DE15 3 and was fitted with a 1,250 hp (930 kW) engine.

As of 1 April 2016, one Class DE15-2050 locomotive remains in service, DE15 2052, operated by JR West.

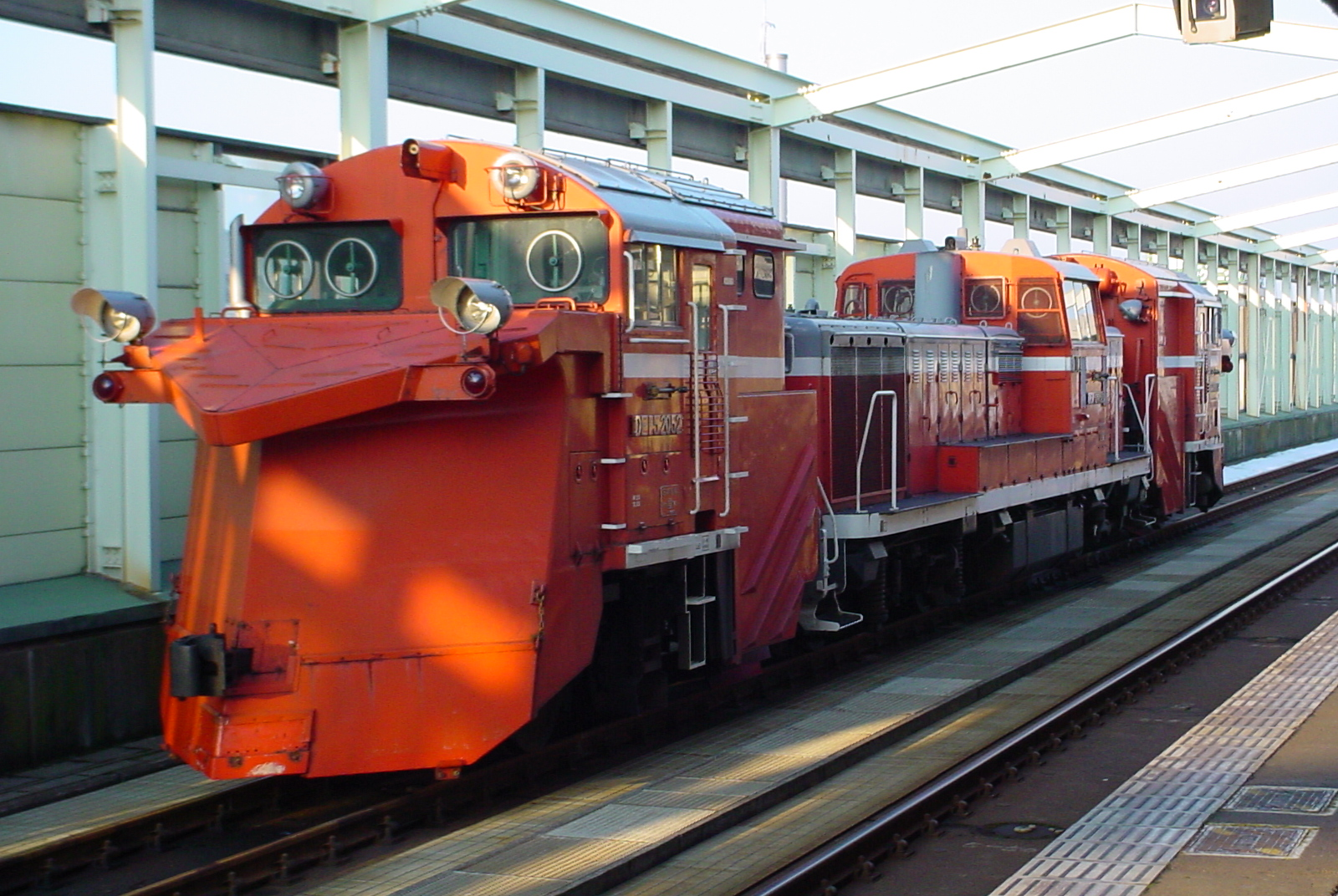
JR West DE15 2052 in January 2006

=== DE15-2500 ===
This subclass was built between 1976 and 1979 by Kawasaki Heavy Industries and Nippon Sharyo with snowplough units at both ends and designed for clearing single-track lines. The locomotives were equipped with a 1,350 hp (1,010 kW) engine and no train-heating steam generator.

As of 1 April 2016, eight Class DE15-2500 locomotives remain in service, operated by JR Hokkaido (five locomotives) and JR West (three locomotives).

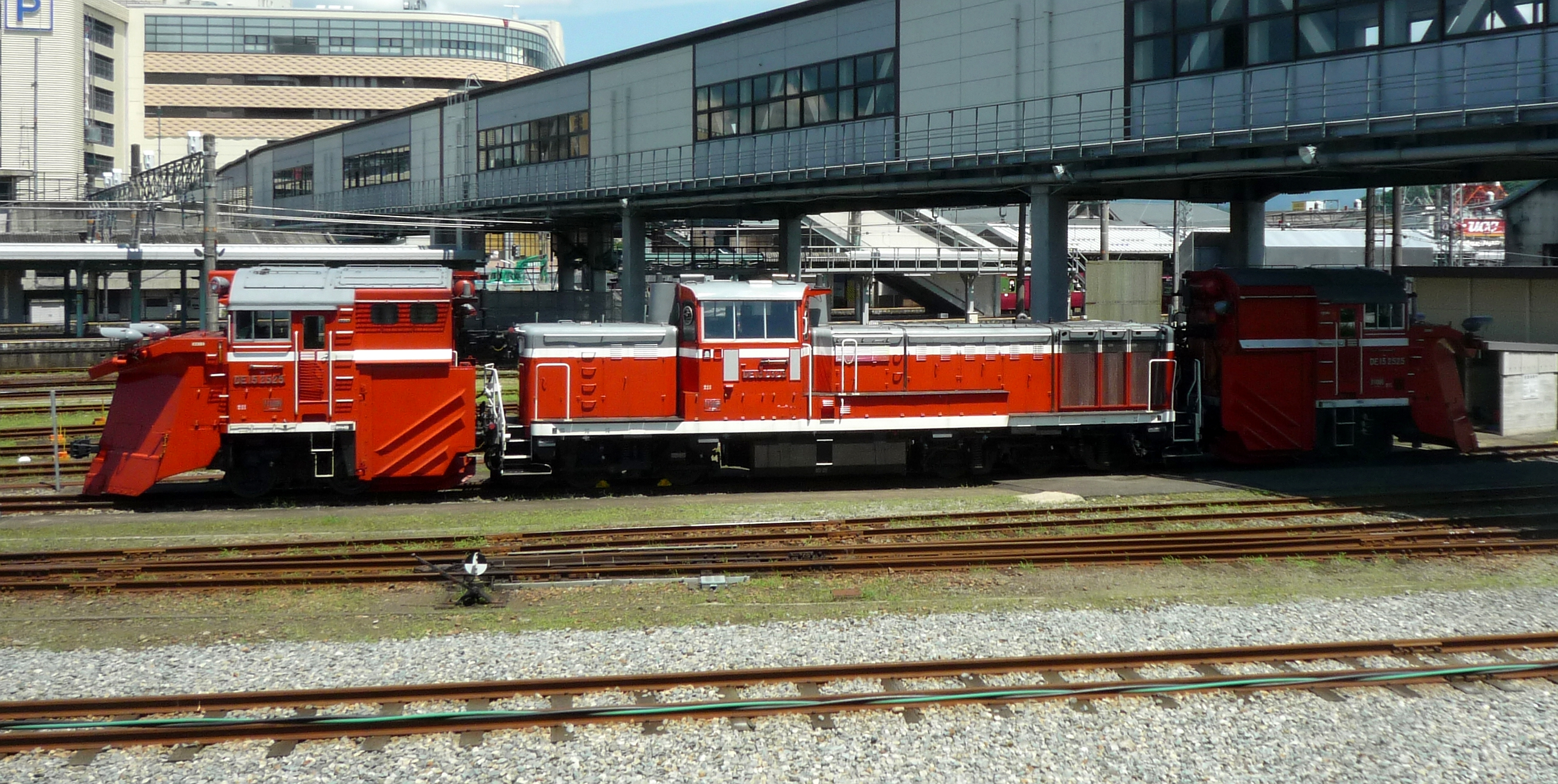
JR West DE15 2525 in July 2010

=== DE15-2550 ===
Five Class DE15-2500 locomotives were formed by modifying Class DE15-1500 locomotives with the addition of a second snowplough unit at the other end. These were designed for clearing single-track lines.

| Original number | Modified number |
|---|---|
| DE15 1505 | DE15 2555 |
| DE15 1506 | DE15 2556 |
| DE15 1508 | DE15 2558 |
| DE15 1513 | DE15 2563 |
| DE15 1517 | DE15 2567 |

As of 1 April 2016, one Class DE15-2550 locomotive remains in service, DE15 2558, operated by JR West.

== Livery variations ==
- DE15 1534: Repainted into a light-green livery for used on JR Hokkaido Furano-Biei Norokko excursion services
- DE15 1535: Repainted into a multi color livery for used on JR Hokkaido Furano-Biei Norokko excursion services
- DE15 2508: Repainted into a white livery for use on JR Hokkaido Norokko excursion train services during summer months
- DE15 2510: Repainted into a red and black livery for use as a helper locomotive on JR Hokkaido steam-hauled SL Nemuro services since 2001
- DE15 2516: Repainted into a light green livery for use on JR Hokkaido Furano-Biei Norokko excursion services
- DE15 2558: Repainted into a blue and white livery for use on JR West excursion train services on the Kisuki Line
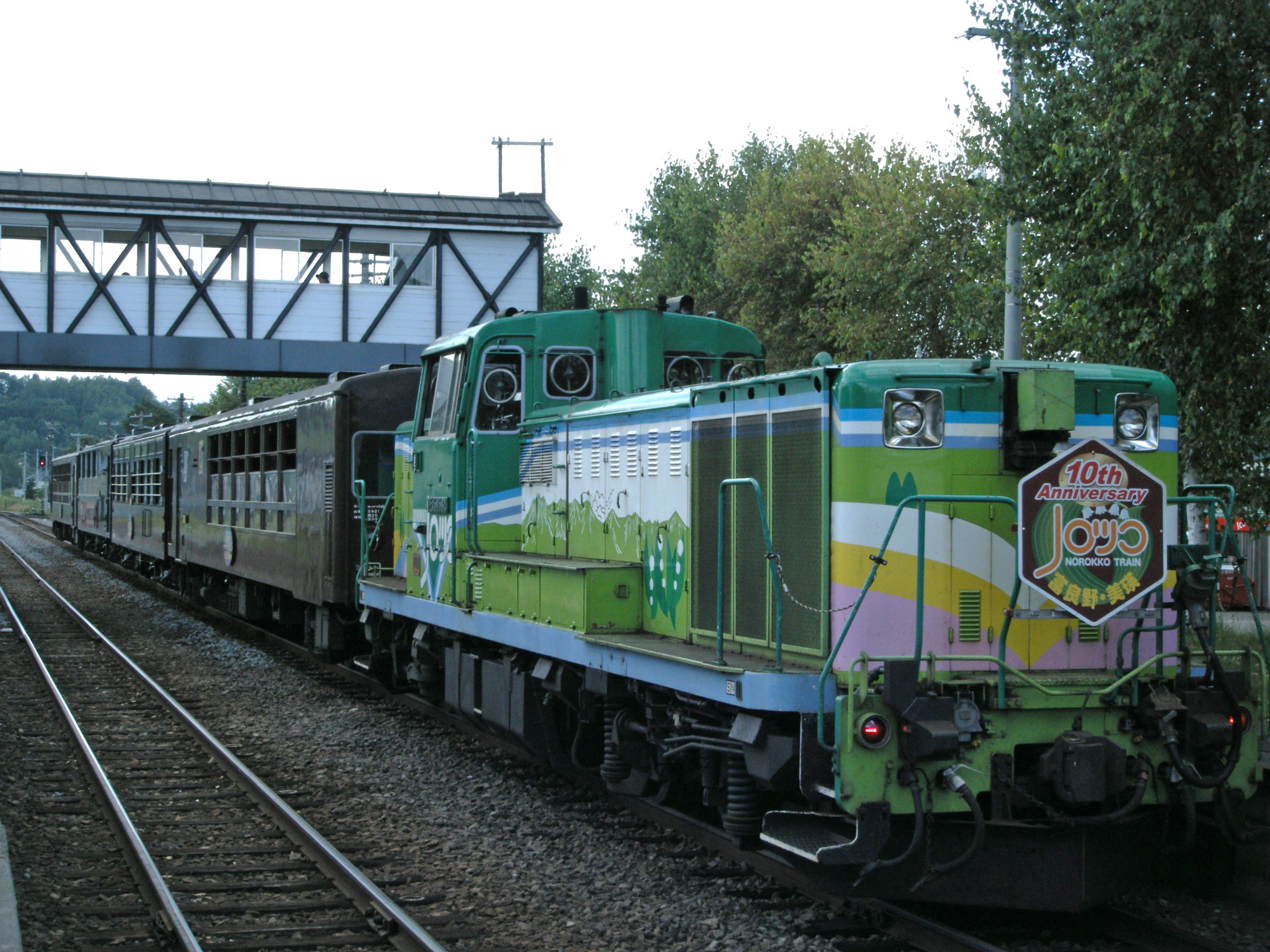
JR Hokkaido DE15 1534 in August 2008

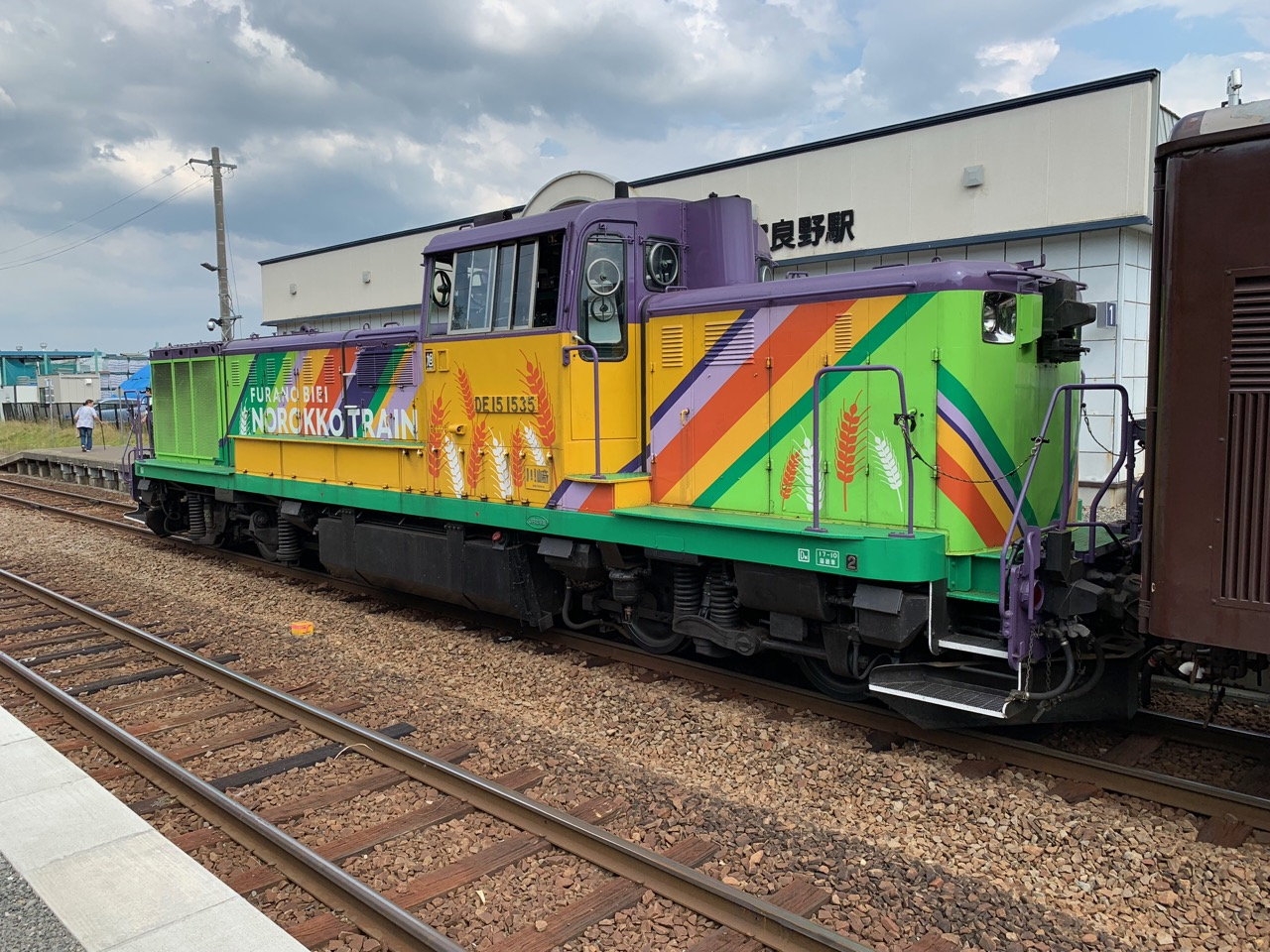
JR Hokkaido DE15 1535 in August 2019

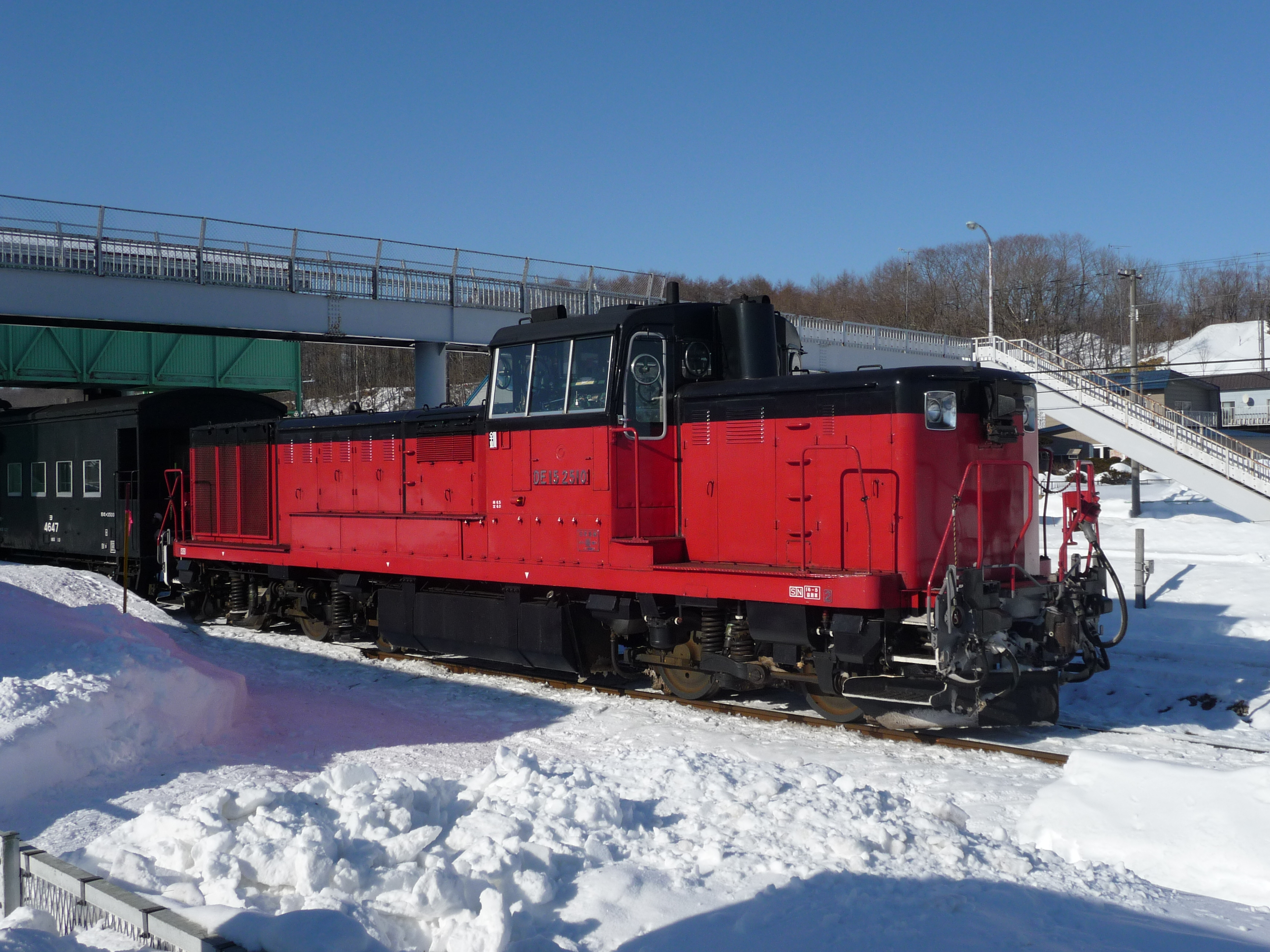
JR Hokkaido DE15 2510 in January 2010

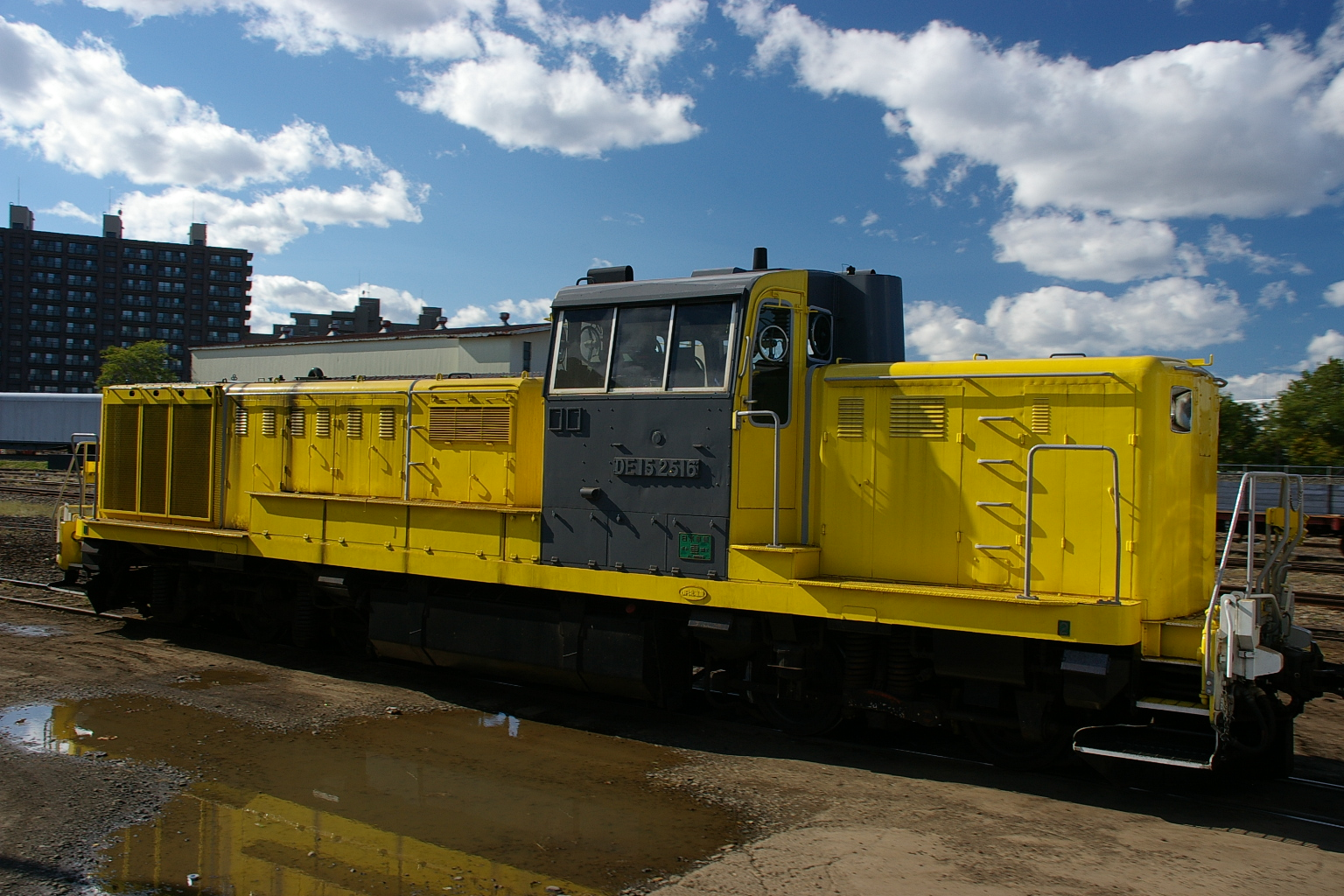
JR Hokkaido DE15 2516 in a yellow livery used as the works shunter at Naebo Works in October 2007

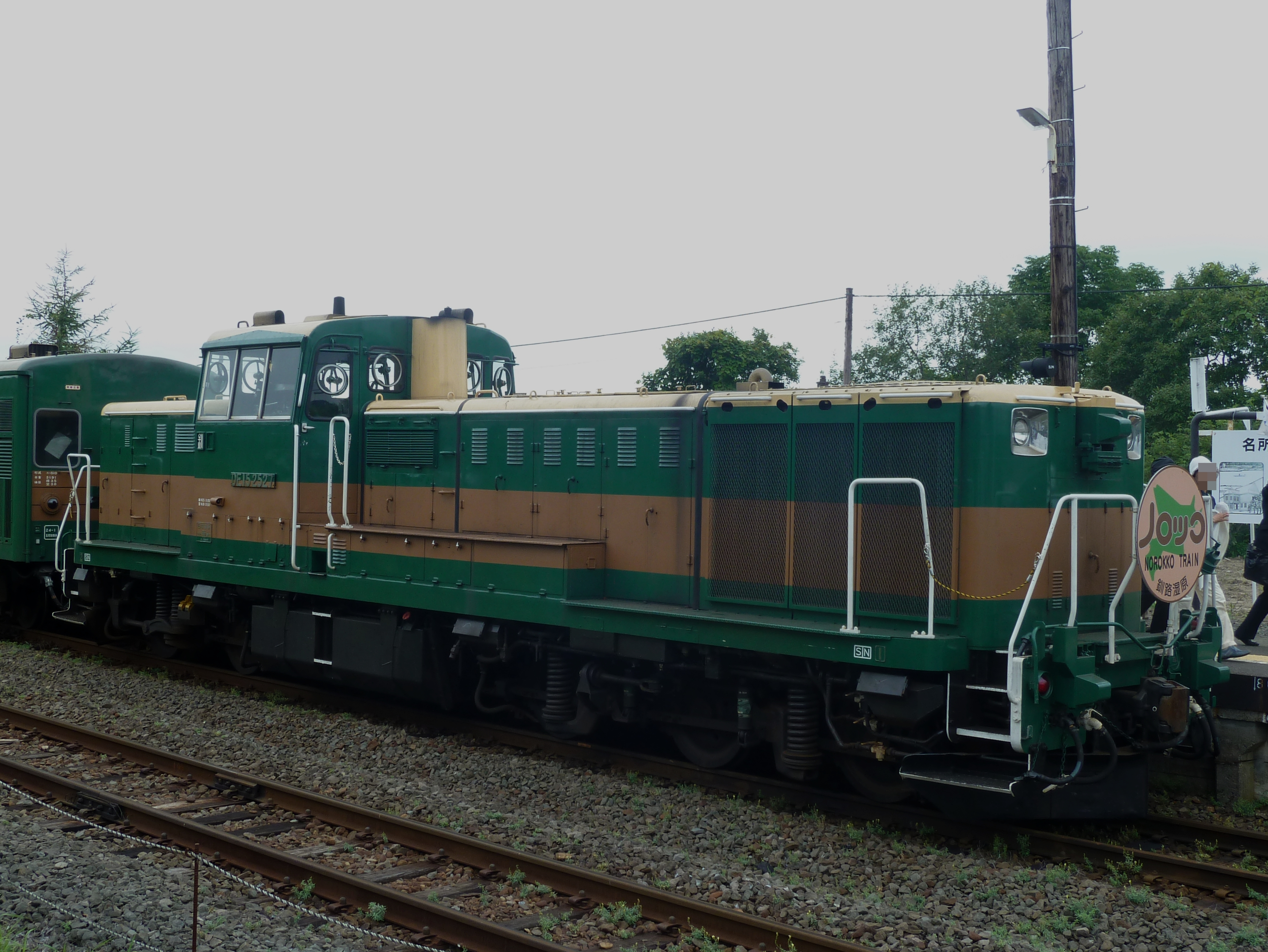
JR Hokkaido DE15 2527 in Norokko green livery in August 2012

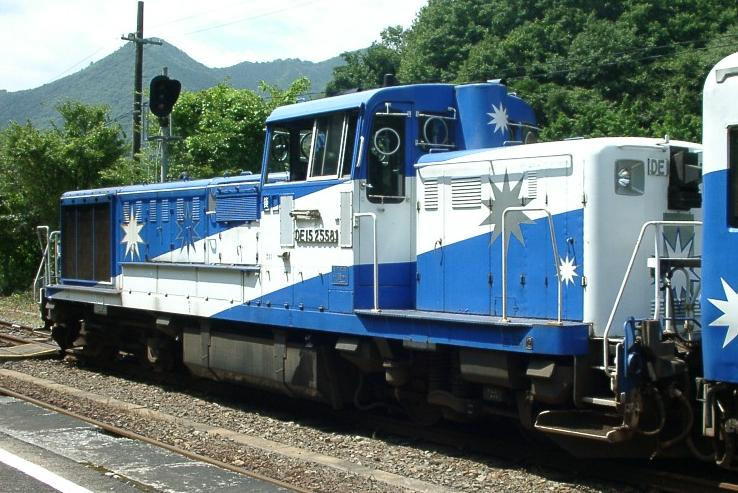
JR West DE15 2558 in August 2001

== Conversion to DE10-3000/3500 ==
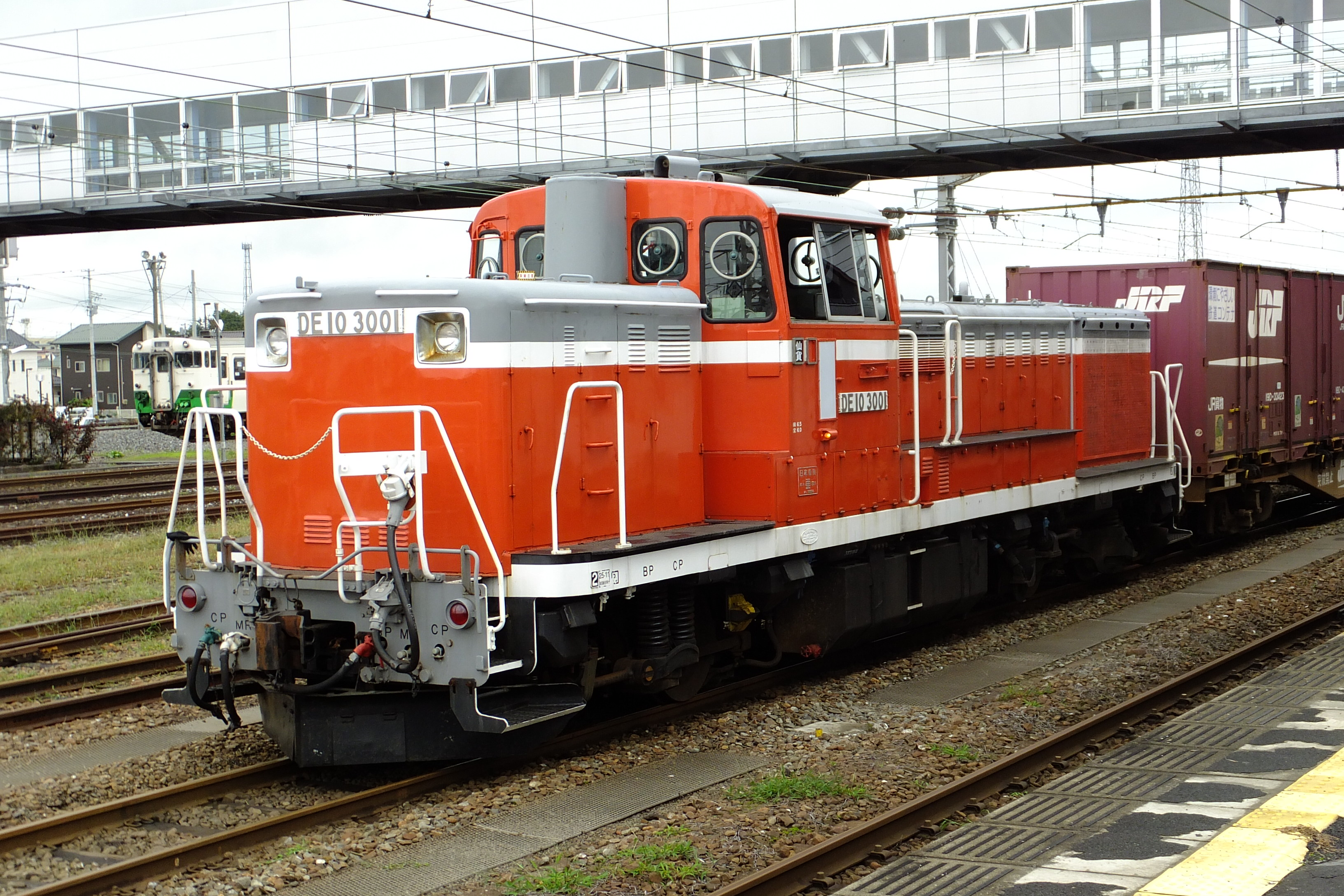
DE10 3001 in September 2015

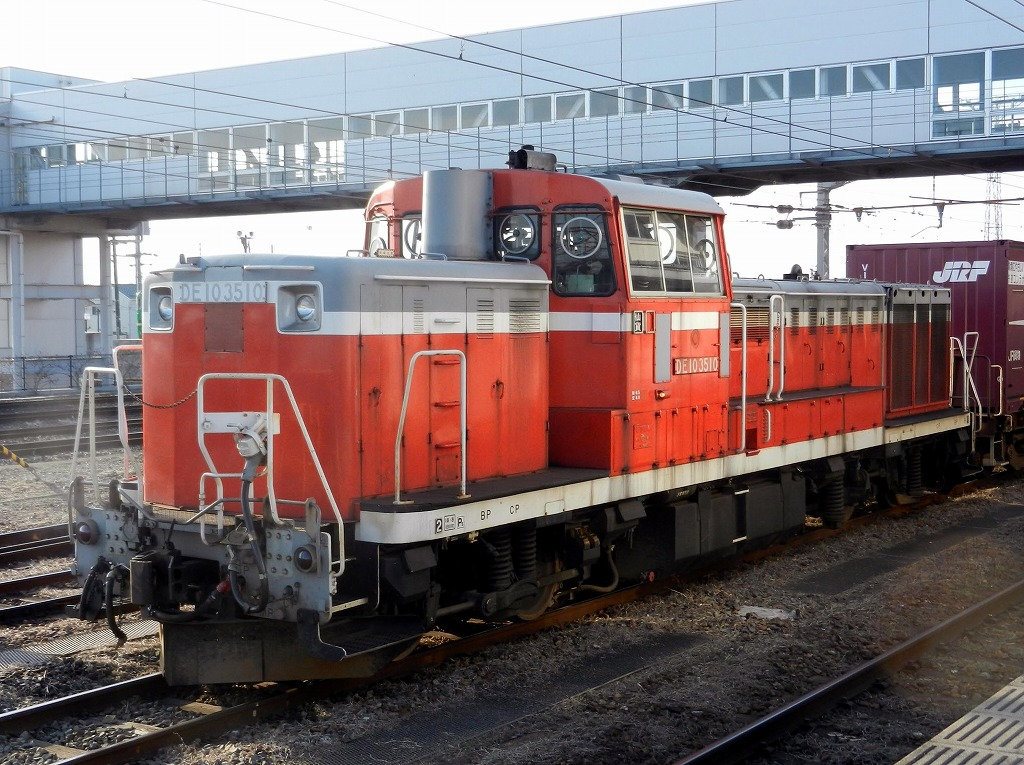
DE10 3510 in April 2013

In 2009, fourteen surplus JR East Class DE15 locomotives were sold to JR Freight for use on freight services, and these were rebuilt and renumbered as Class DE10-3000 and DE10-3500. The conversion histories and former identities of this sub-class are as follows.

| JR East No. | JR Freight No. | Date built | Manufacturer | Date converted | Date withdrawn |
|---|---|---|---|---|---|
| DE15 1001 | DE10 3001 | 6 December 1971 | Nippon Sharyo | 5 June 2009 | |
| DE15 1510 | DE10 3501 | October 1973 | Nippon Sharyo | 8 May 2009 | |
| DE15 1516 | DE10 3502 | 16 December 1975 | Nippon Sharyo | 7 April 2009 | 25 November 2009 |
| DE15 2567 (Note: Originally built as DE15 1517.) | DE10 3503 | 14 January 1976 | Nippon Sharyo | 29 May 2009 | FY2011 |
| DE15 1522 | DE10 3504 | 2 March 1976 | Nippon Sharyo | 24 April 2009 | FY2011 |
| DE15 1523 | DE10 3505 | 9 March 1976 | Nippon Sharyo | 6 April 2009 | |
| DE15 1529 | DE10 3506 | 4 October 1976 | Kawasaki Heavy Industries | 15 May 2009 | |
| DE15 1530 | DE10 3507 | 7 October 1976 | Kawasaki Heavy Industries | 24 June 2009 | |
| DE15 1536 | DE10 3508 | 9 September 1977 | Kawasaki Heavy Industries | 7 April 2009 | |
| DE15 2505 | DE10 3509 | 21 October 1977 | Nippon Sharyo | 18 May 2009 | |
| DE15 2506 | DE10 3510 | 28 October 1977 | Nippon Sharyo | 19 May 2009 | |
| DE15 1539 | DE10 3511 | 10 November 1978 | Kawasaki Heavy Industries | 23 April 2009 | |
| DE15 2513 | DE10 3512 | 15 November 1978 | Kawasaki Heavy Industries | 12 May 2009 | |
| DE15 2524 | DE10 3513 | 20 November 1980 | Kawasaki Heavy Industries | 27 April 2009 | |

== Fleet status ==
By 1 April 1995, 71 locomotives were still in service.

As of 1 April 2016, 25 locomotives remain in service, operated by JR Hokkaido (9× DE15 1500 and 5× DE15 2500), JR East (2× DE15 1500), JR West (4× DE15 1500, 1× DE15 2050, 3× DE15 2500, 1× DE15 2550).

== Classification ==
The DE15 classification for this locomotive type is explained below.

- D: Diesel locomotive
- E: Five driving axles
- 15: Locomotive with maximum speed of 85 km/h or less
