= Co-Bo =

Locomotive wheel arrangement

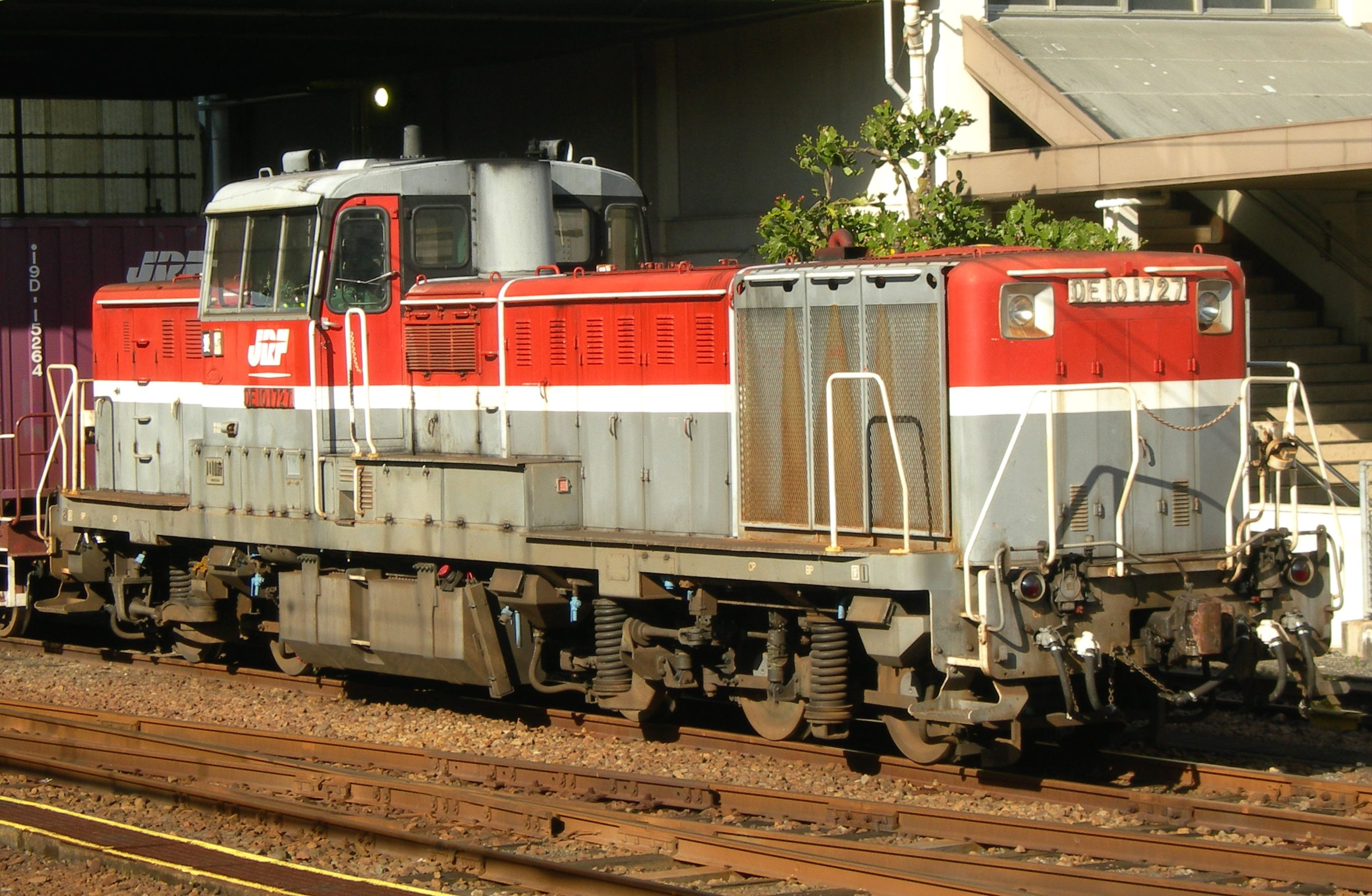
Japanese DE10 C-B class

Co-Bo or Co′Bo′ is a wheel arrangement in the UIC classification system for railway locomotives. It features two uncoupled bogies. The capital letter indicates the number of axles on the bogie, the 'o' indicates that they are driven, so the "Co" bogie has three driven axles and the "Bo" bogie has two.

The arrangement has been used to even out axle loading. The weight distribution of the locomotive depends on the power unit, the engine and generator. If these are not placed symmetrically, the weight distribution is also biased to one end. Placing three axles beneath the engine end and just two beneath the other, with the lighter ancillaries, gives more even loading per-axle.

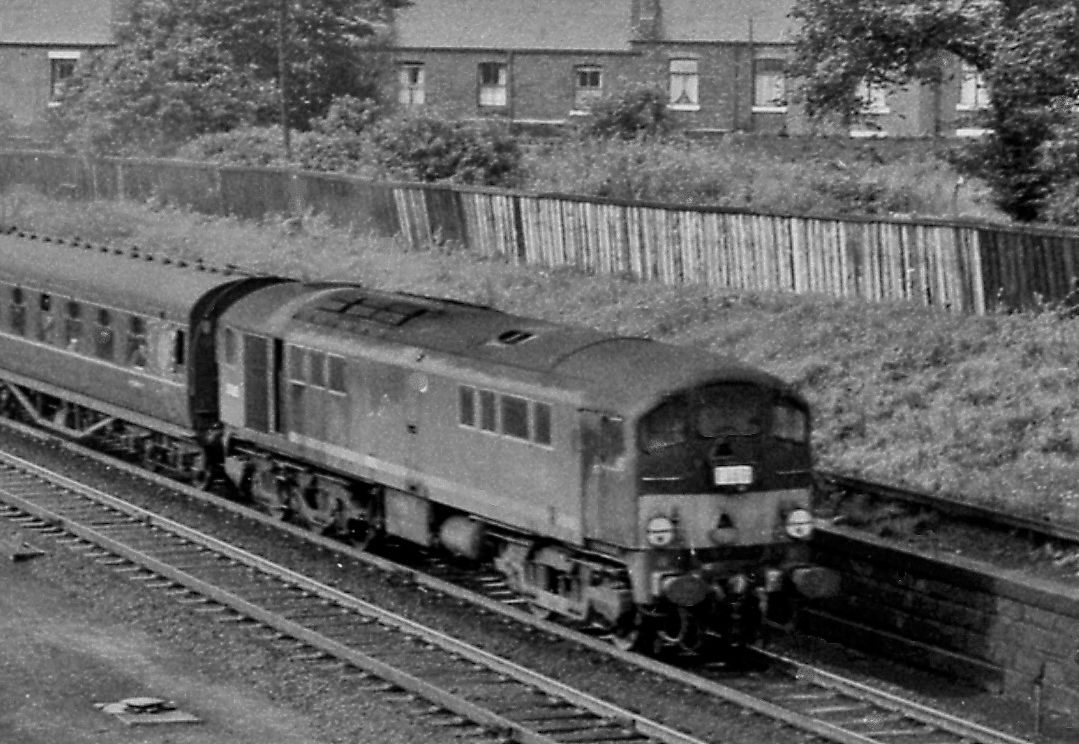
British Railways Class 28

== Examples ==
=== Diesel ===
The British Railways Class 28 is the first (and only) diesel locomotive with a Co-Bo wheel arrangement, where the wheels are independently driven.

==== C'B' ====
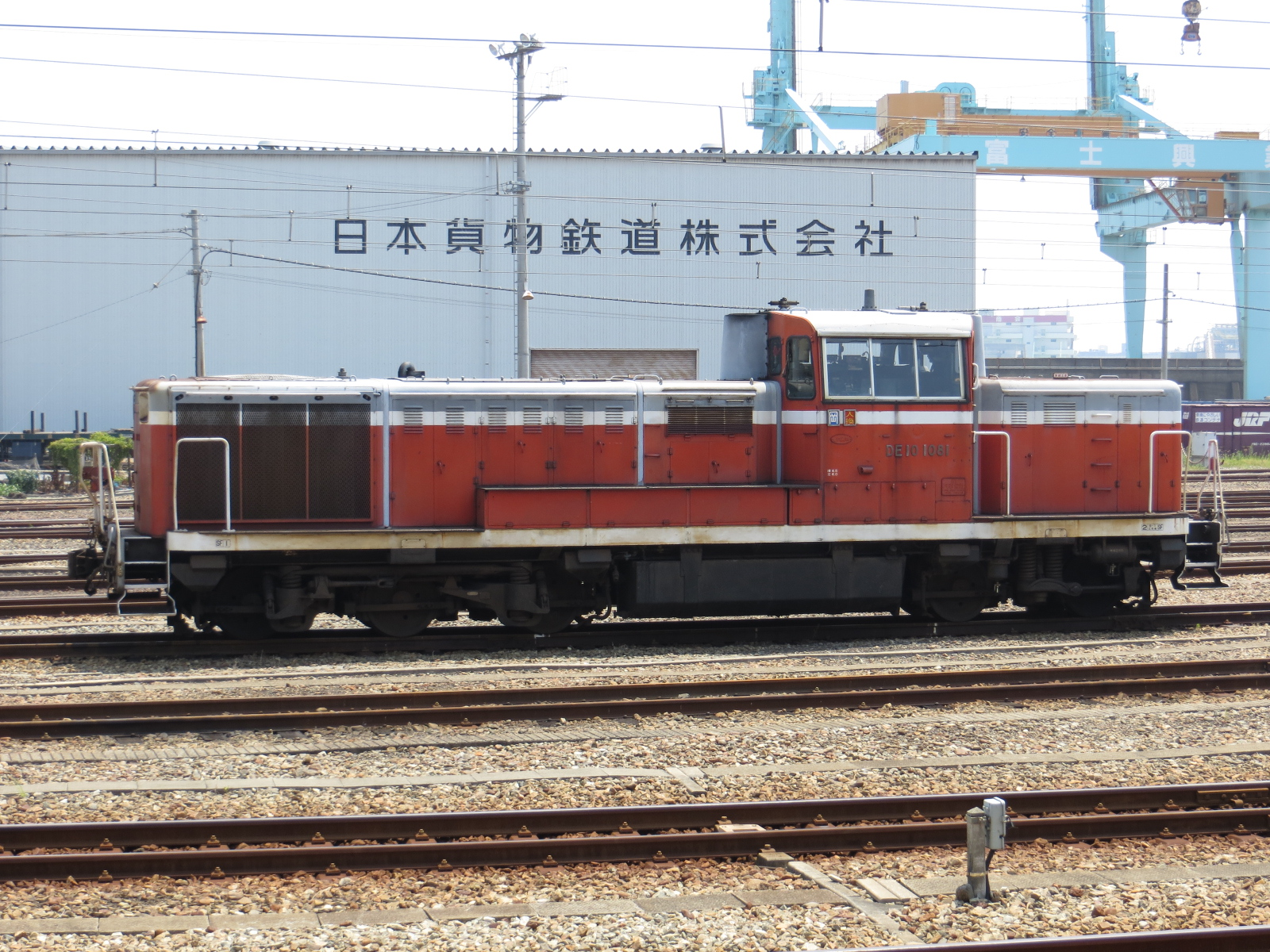
DE 10 class

A similar wheel arrangement, with five axles across two bogies, is also used in Japan for the Class DE10, DE11, and DE15 locomotives. As these are diesel-hydraulic locomotives, they are of C-B arrangement, not Co-Bo. A hydrodynamic transmission on the locomotive frame is driven by the prime mover, then drive to each bogie is taken by cardan shafts. The axles of each bogie are all driven, and all geared together, rather than having separate traction motors.

=== Steam ===
Some Engerth steam locomotives were built to the Fink system, with the four trailing wheels driven by a crankshaft and connecting rods, thus making them 0-6-4-0Ts instead of 0-6-4Ts.

=== Electric ===
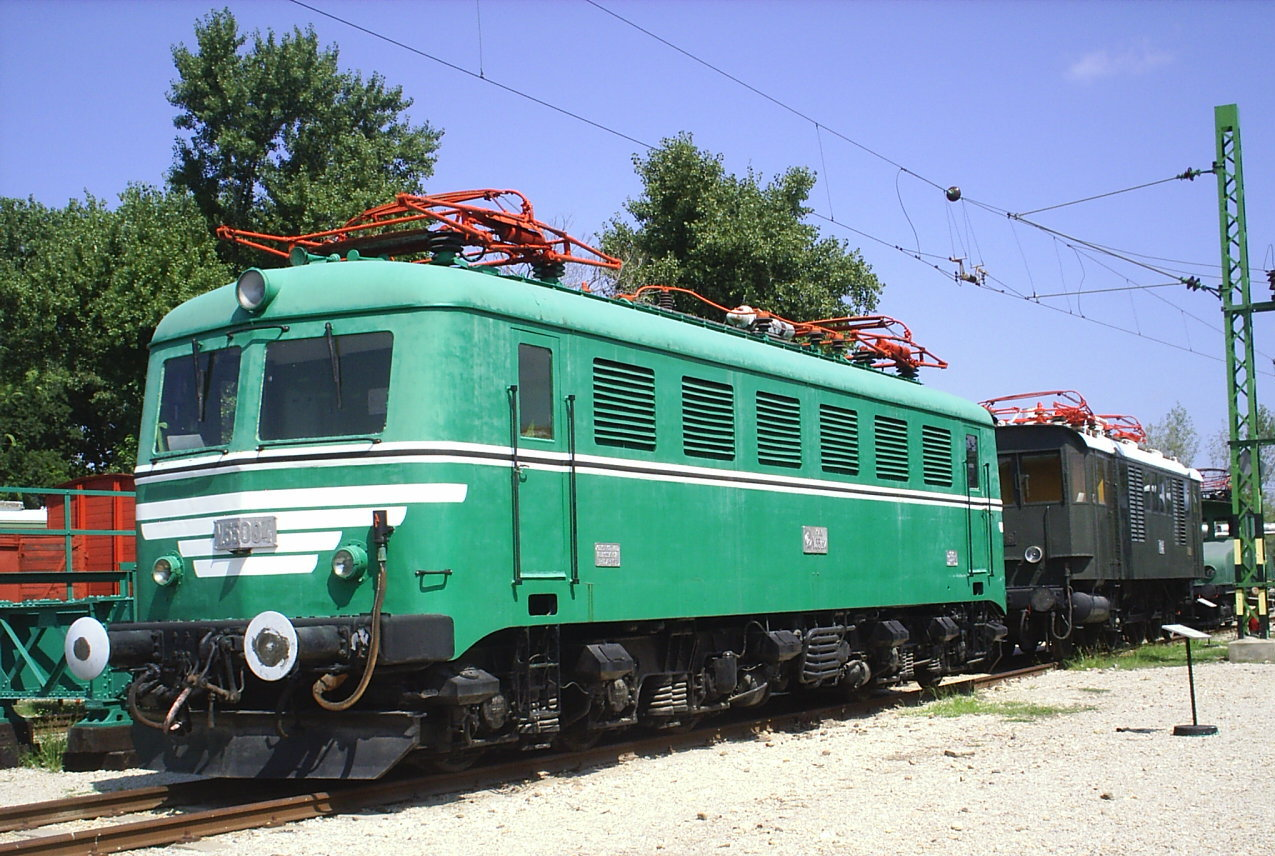
V55 preserved in the Hungarian Railway History Park

The Hungarian Railways Class V55 also used a Co'Bo' wheel arrangement with three-phase slip-ring motors driving each axle.

== In fiction ==
BoCo is a fictional Co-Bo locomotive, a British Rail Class 28. The locomotive appeared in the Railway Series book Main Line Engines and the Thomas & Friends television series.

== See also ==
- Co-Co, has two six-wheeled bogies with all axles powered
