= JNR Class DD15 =

Diesel snowplough locomotive type operated in Japan

Class DD15
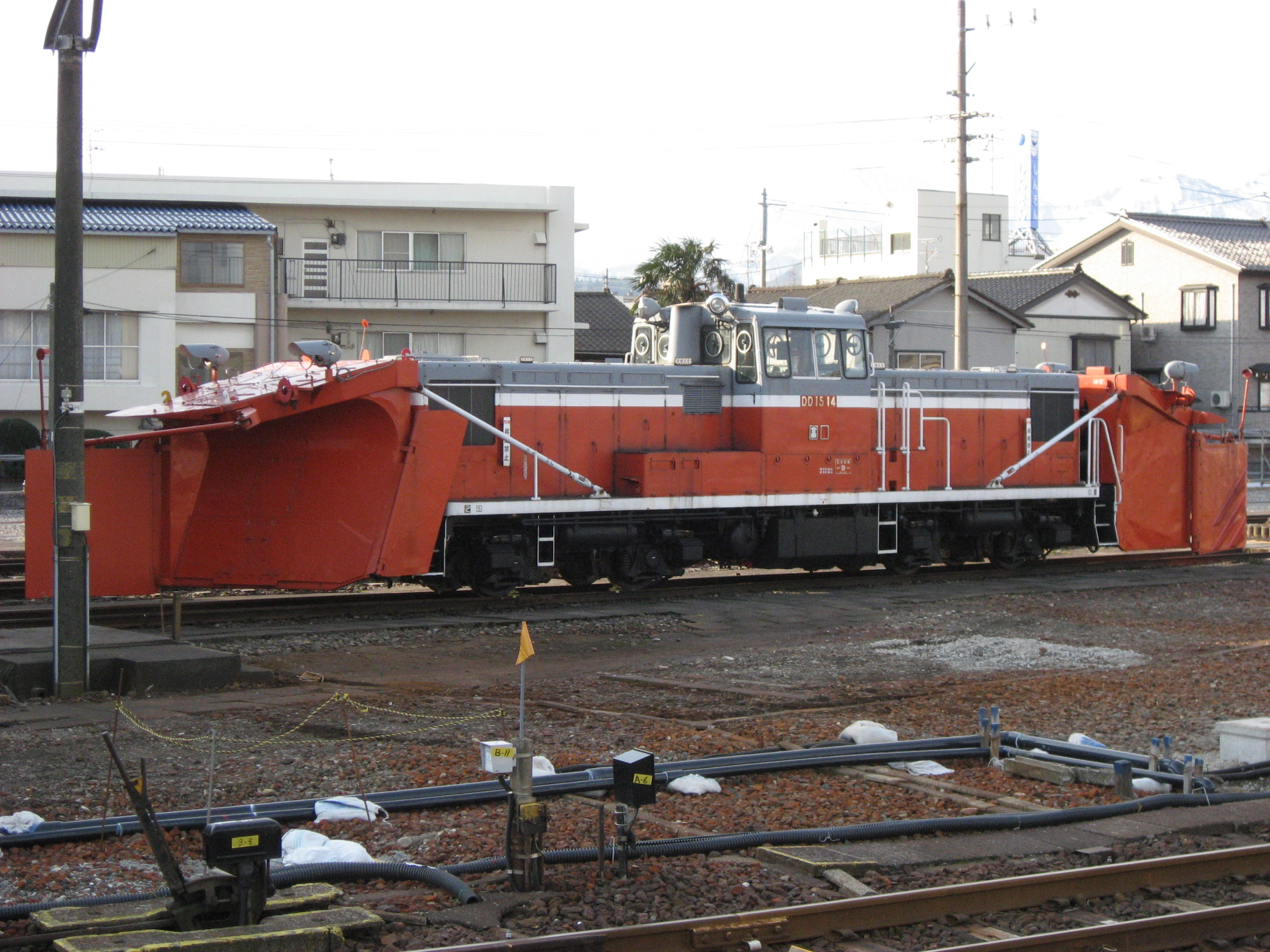
- JR West DD15 14 in February 2010
Type and origin
- Power type: Diesel-hydraulic
- Builder: Nippon Sharyo
- Build date: 1961–1966
- Total produced: 50
Specifications
- Configuration
  - Commonwealth: Bo-Bo
- Gauge: 1,067 mm (3 ft 6 in)
- Length: 13,600 mm (44 ft 7 in) (locomotive only); 21,200 mm (69 ft 7 in) (with snowplough units)
- Width: 2,926 mm (9 ft 7.2 in)
- Height: 3,880 mm (12 ft 9 in)
- Axle load: 15.5 t
- Loco weight: 62.0 t
- Fuel type: Diesel
- Fuel capacity: 1,500 l
- RPM range: 1,500
- Engine type: DMF31SB x 2
- Transmission: Hydraulic
Performance figures
- Maximum speed: 70 km/h (45 mph)
- Power output: 1,000 hp (750 kW)
- Tractive effort: 16,500 kgf (162,000 N; 36,000 lbf)
Career
- Operators: ■ JNR (1961-1987); ■ JR East (1987-?); ■ JR West (1987-)
- Number in class: 6 (as of 1 April 2016)
- Delivered: November 1961
- Preserved: 3
- Disposition: In service

The Class DD15 (DD15形) is a four-axle Bo-Bo wheel arrangement diesel-hydraulic locomotive type operated in Japan as a self-propelled snowplough unit since 1961 by the national railway company Japanese National Railways (JNR), and later by East Japan Railway Company (JR East) and West Japan Railway Company (JR West). A total of 50 locomotives were built between 1961 and 1966, and as of 1 April 2016, 6 locomotives remain in service.

== Variants ==
A total of 50 locomotives were built between 1961 and 1966, divided into the following sub-classes.

- Class DD15-0: 46 locomotives built between 1961 and 1965
- Class DD15-300 4 locomotives built in 1966 with modified gearing

== Design ==
The Class DD15 was developed from the Class DD13 locomotive design, with the addition of snowplough units at either end. The snowplough units could be detached, allowing the locomotives to be used for shunting and other duties outside the winter periods. However, with the snowplough units mounted, the locomotive axle load was nearly 16 t, restricting use on rural lines, and so the class was superseded by the later Class DE15 locomotives, which had separate snowplough units. As with the Class DD13 locomotives, the Class DD15 had two 500 hp (370 kW) DMF31SB diesel engines.

== History ==
=== DD15-0 ===
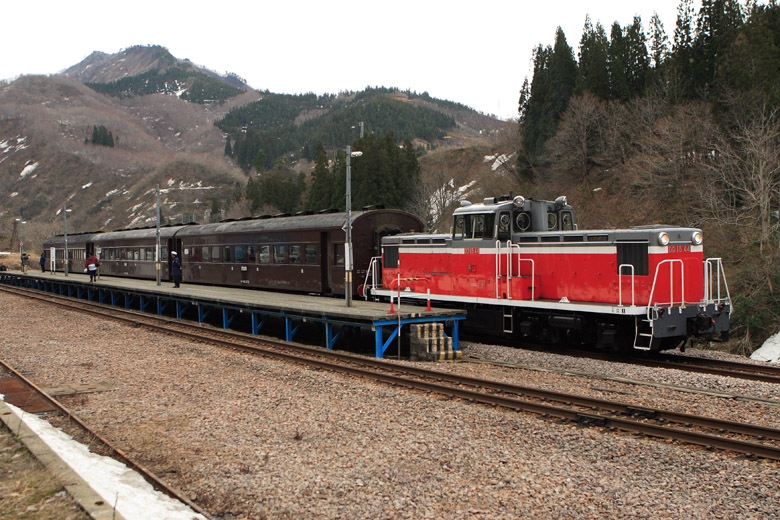
DD15 44 on a special service in April 2007 with its snowplough units removed

46 Class DD15-0 locomotives were built between 1961 and 1965 by Nippon Sharyo, with the first locomotive delivered in November 1961.

As of 1 April 2016, six Class DD15-0 locomotives remain in service.

=== DD15-300 ===
Four Class DD15-300 locomotives were built in 1966 by Nippon Sharyo. These locomotives had a modified gear ratio, changed from 1:3.143 to 1:3.196.

As of 1 April 2016, no Class DD15-300 locomotives remain in service.

== Fleet status ==
At the time of privatization of Japanese National Railways (JNR) on 1 April 1987, 32 Class DD15 locomotives remained in service, with JR East receiving 19 and JR West receiving 13. By 1 April 1995, 25 locomotives were still in service, operated by JR East and JR West, including two DD15-300 locomotives.

As of 1 April 2016, six locomotives remain in service, all operated by JR West.

== Preserved examples ==
As of 2014, three Class DD15 locomotives are preserved.

- DD15 17: Preserved at the Mikasa Railway Park in Mikasa, Hokkaido
- DD15 30: Preserved at the Tsuyama Railroad Educational Museum in Tsuyama, Okayama (Built in 1964, Previously operated by Toyama Chiho Railway, and moved to Tsuyama following its withdrawal in 2011.)
- DD15 37: Preserved at the Otaru Museum in Otaru, Hokkaido
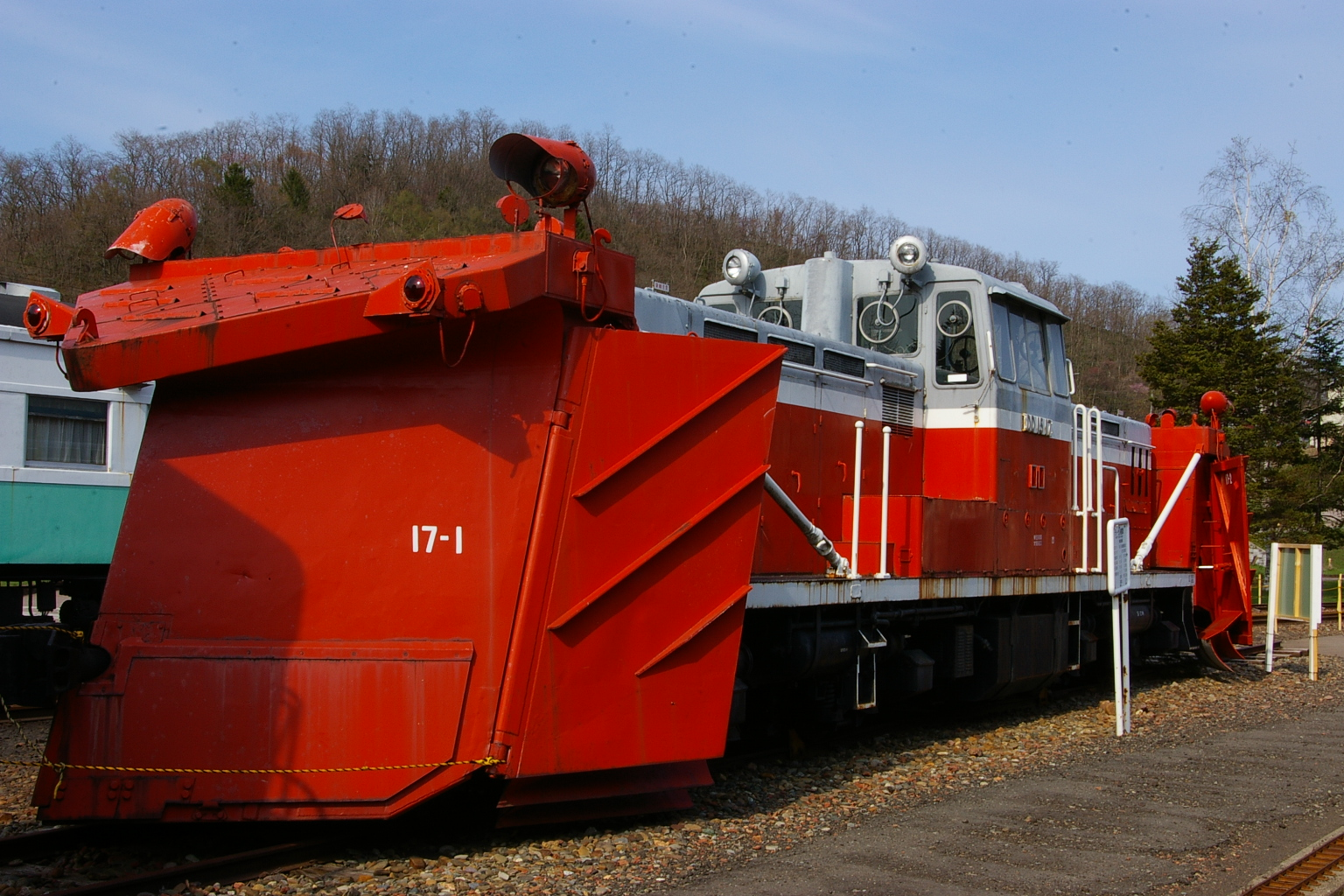
Preserved DD15 17 in May 2007

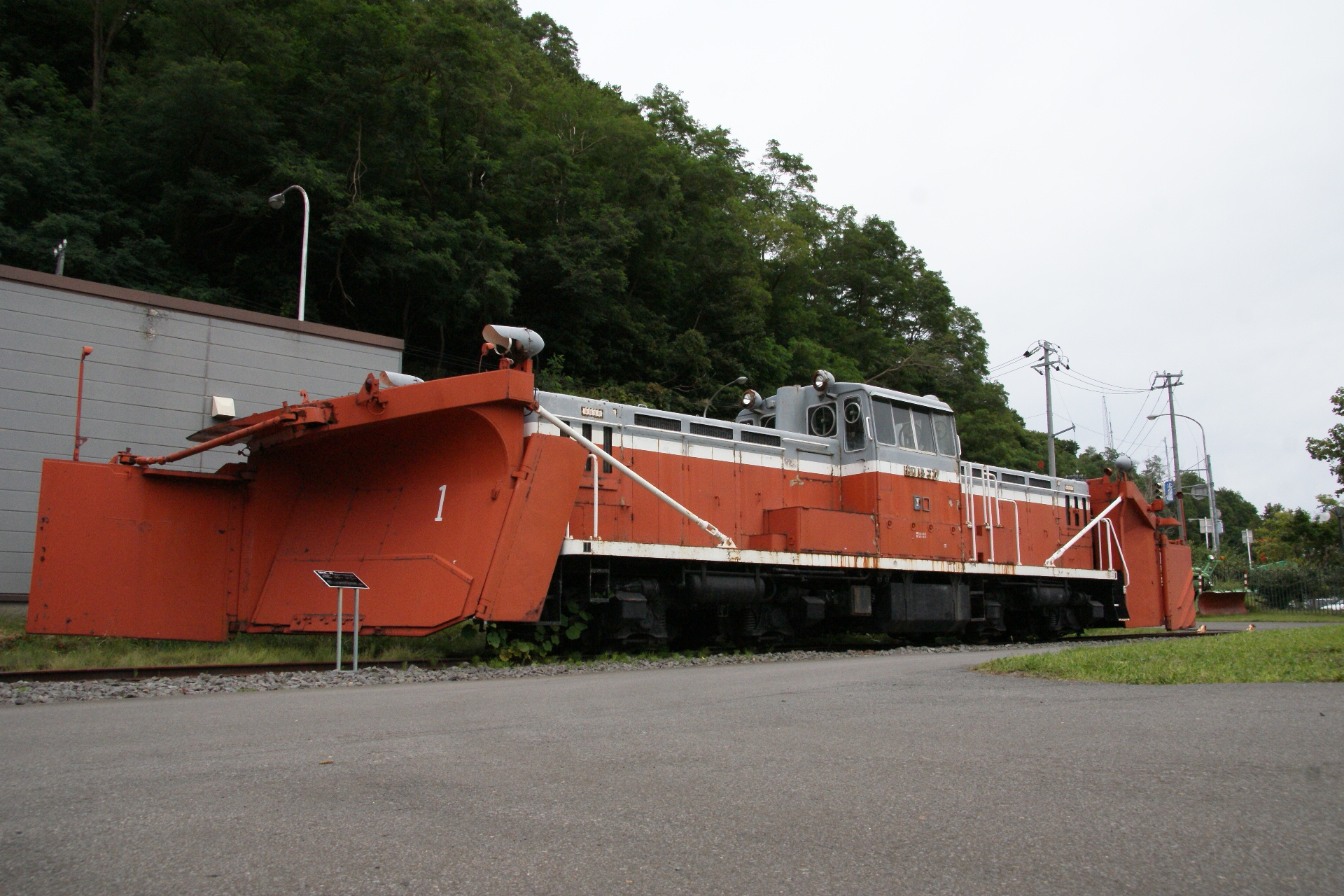
Preserved DD15 37 in August 2009

== Classification ==
The DD15 classification for this locomotive type is explained below.

- D: Diesel locomotive
- D: Four driving axles
- 15: Locomotive with maximum speed of 85 km/h or less
