= Prime mover (locomotive) =

Main power source in a locomotive

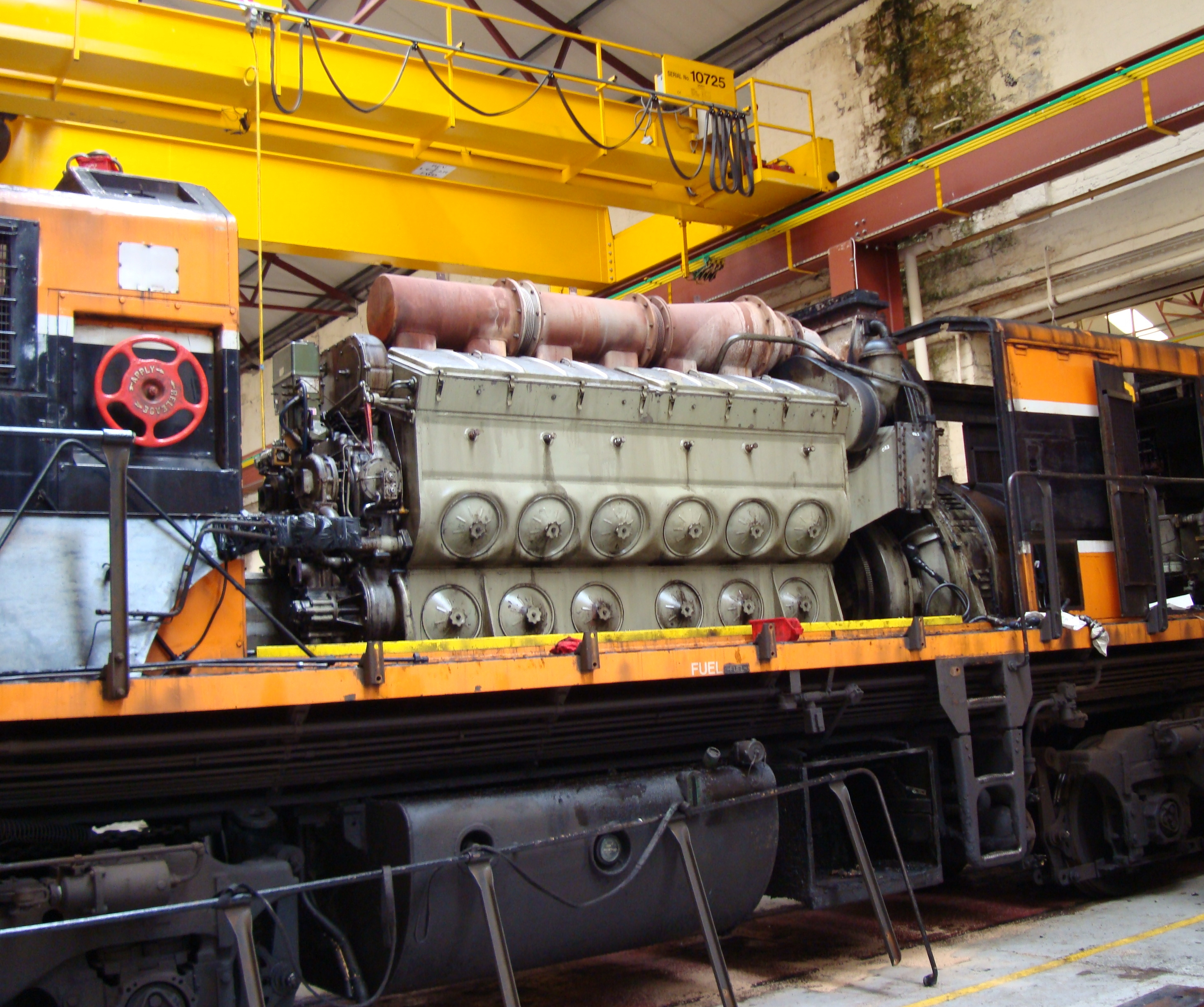
An EMD 12-645E3 turbocharged two-stroke diesel engine, installed in an Irish 071 class locomotive

In engineering, a prime mover is an engine that converts chemical energy of a fuel into useful work. In a locomotive, the prime mover is thus the source of power for its propulsion. In an engine-generator set, the engine is the prime mover, as distinct from the generator.

== Definition ==
In a diesel-mechanical locomotive, the prime mover is the diesel engine that is mechanically coupled to the driving wheels (drivers). In a diesel-hydraulic locomotive, the prime mover is the diesel engine that powers the pumps of one or more torque converters mechanically coupled to the drivers. In a diesel-electric locomotive, the prime mover is the diesel engine that rotates the main generator responsible for producing electricity to power the traction motors that are geared to the drivers. The prime mover can also be a gas turbine instead of a diesel engine. In either case, the generator, traction motors and interconnecting apparatus are considered to be the power transmission system and not part of the prime mover. A wired-electric or battery-electric locomotive has no on-board prime mover, instead relying on an external power station.

== Weight distribution ==
The power unit represents the main weight in a locomotive design, other than the chassis or body. Its position back and forth is at the designer's choice and may be used to control overall weight distribution. In most locomotives designs, the power unit is placed centrally. In some locomotives, it is offset to one end, or the heavier engine is outboard of the generator. In extreme cases, such as C-B wheel arrangements, the weight on each bogie may differ so much that the engine-end bogie is given an extra carrying axle, to keep individual axle loads more consistent.

== See also ==
- Engine
- Powerpack (drivetrain)
