= JNR Class DE10 =

Japanese diesel locomotive type

Class DE10
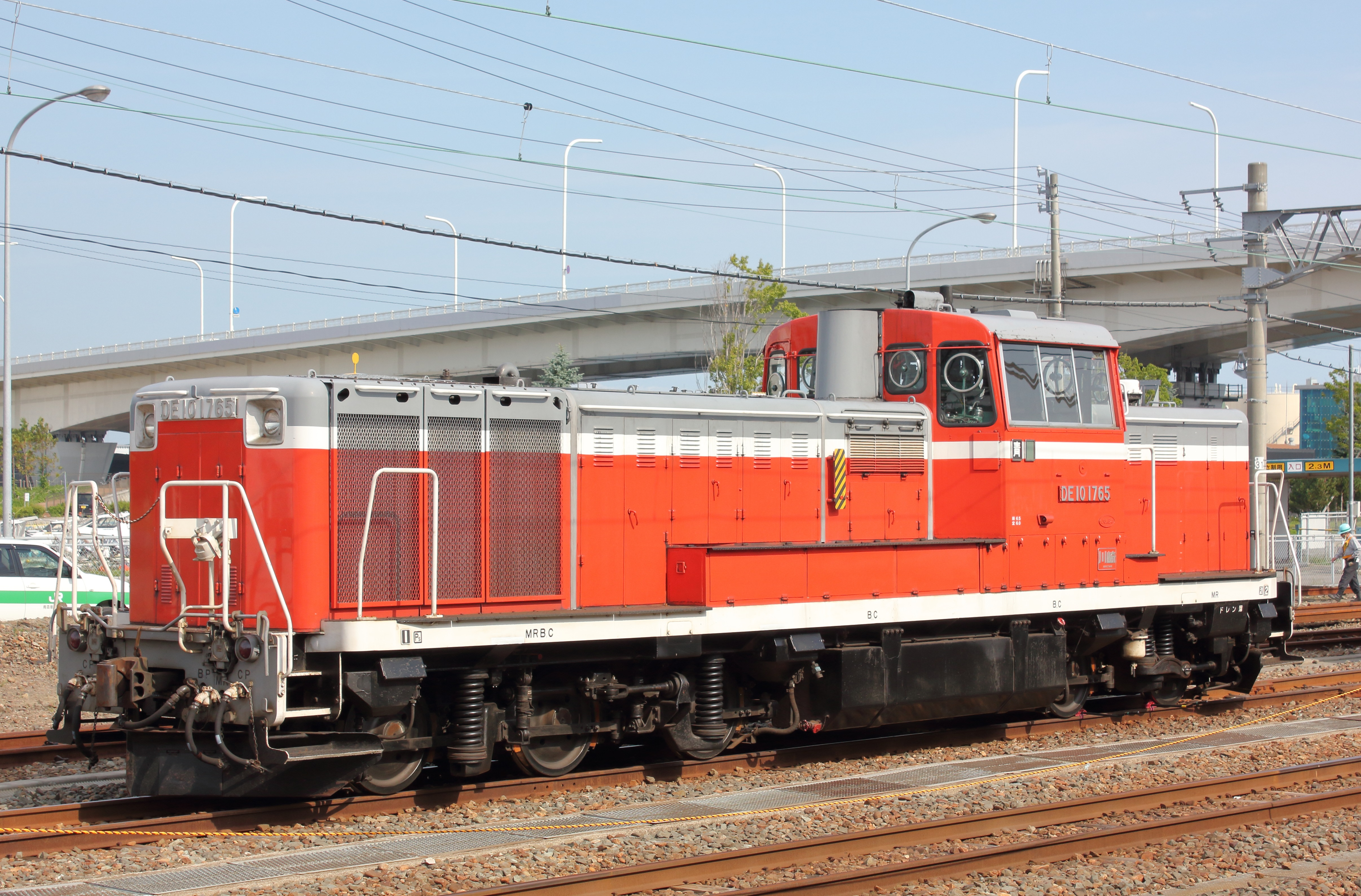
- JR East DE10 1765 in September 2015
Type and origin
- Power type: Diesel-hydraulic
- Builder: Kisha Seizo, Nippon Sharyo
- Build date: 1966 - 1978
- Total produced: 708
Specifications
- Configuration
  - UIC: C'B'
  - Commonwealth: C-B
- Gauge: 1,067 mm (3 ft 6 in)
- Wheel diameter: 860 mm (2 ft 10 in)
- Length: 14,150 mm (46 ft 5 in)
- Width: 2,950 mm (9 ft 8 in)
- Height: 3,965 mm (13 ft 0.1 in)
- Loco weight: 65 t (72 short tons; 64 long tons)
- Transmission: Hydraulic
Performance figures
- Maximum speed: 85 km/h (55 mph)
- Power output: 1,250 hp (930 kW); 1,350 hp (1,005 kW) (DE10-1000 onward)
Career
- Operators: JNR, JR Hokkaido, JR East, JR Central, JR West, JR Shikoku, JR Kyushu, JR Freight
- Number in class: 138 (as of 1 April 2016)
- Disposition: 138 units in operation, 1 preserved, remainder scrapped

The Class DE10 (DE10形) is a class of Japanese C-B wheel arrangement diesel-hydraulic road switcher locomotives. 708 locomotives were built between 1966 and 1978. As of 1 April 2016, 138 locomotives remained in operation.

== Variants ==
=== DE10-0 subclass ===
158 DE10-0 locomotives were built with steam heating boilers for passenger use.

None of this subclass remains in use on JR, but several examples operate on private railways. DE10 1 is preserved at JR Shikoku's Tadotsu depot.

=== DE10-500 subclass ===
74 DE10-500 locomotives were built from 1968 with concrete ballast in place of the steam heating boilers for freight use. None of this subclass remains in use on JR, but several examples operate on private railways.

=== DE10-900 subclass ===
One prototype locomotive, DE10 901, was built in 1967 as a heavy shunting locomotive with ballasting increasing the weight to 70 tonnes. This formed the basis for the Class DE11 design.

=== DE10-1000 subclass ===
210 DE10-1000 locomotives were built from 1969 with steam heating boilers and uprated DML61ZB engines offering 1,350 hp (1,005 kW).

=== DE10-1500 subclass ===
265 DE10-1500 locomotives were built from 1969 with uprated DML61ZB engines and concrete ballast in place of the steam heating boilers for freight use.

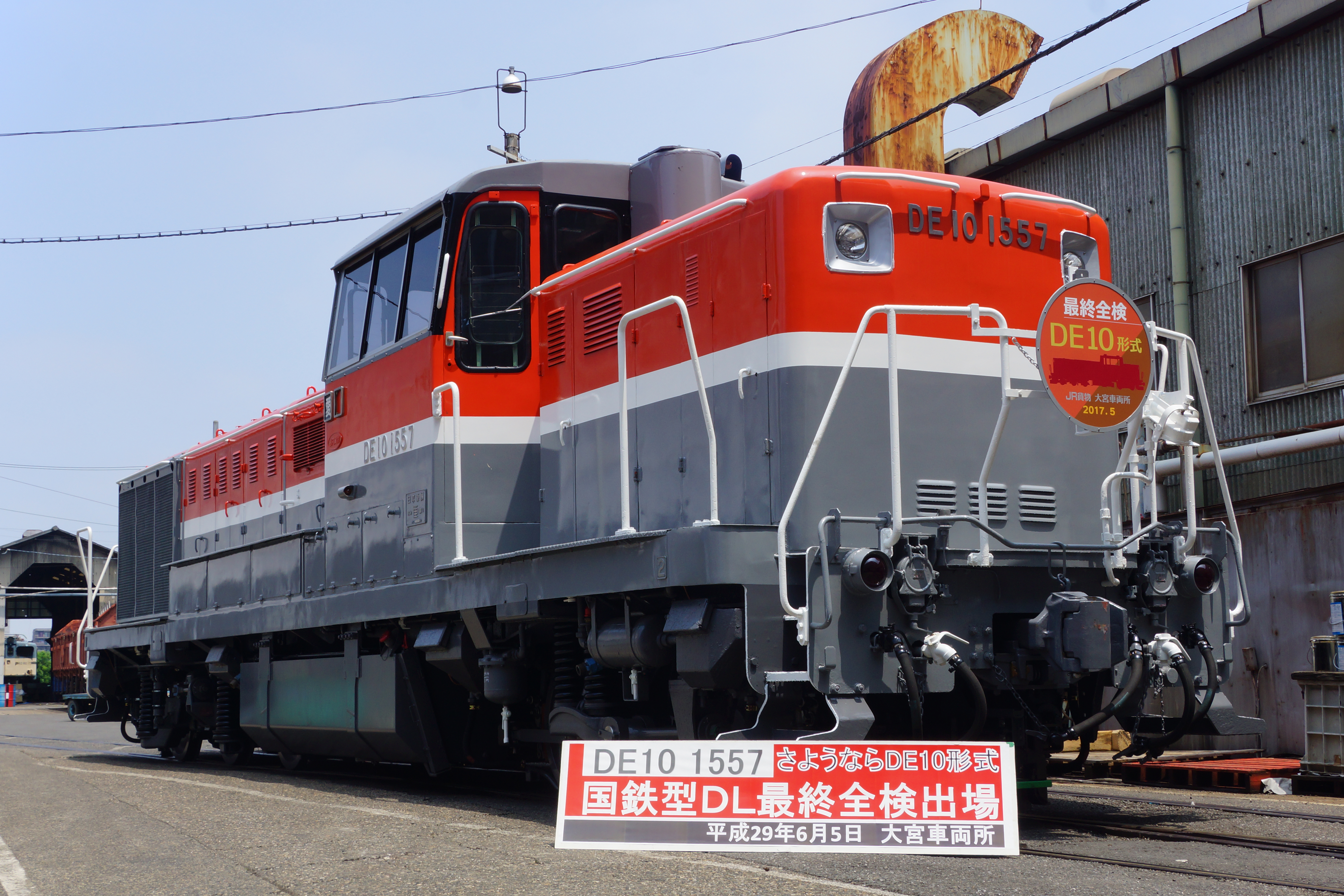
DE10 1557 in May 2017

=== DE10-3000/3500 subclass ===
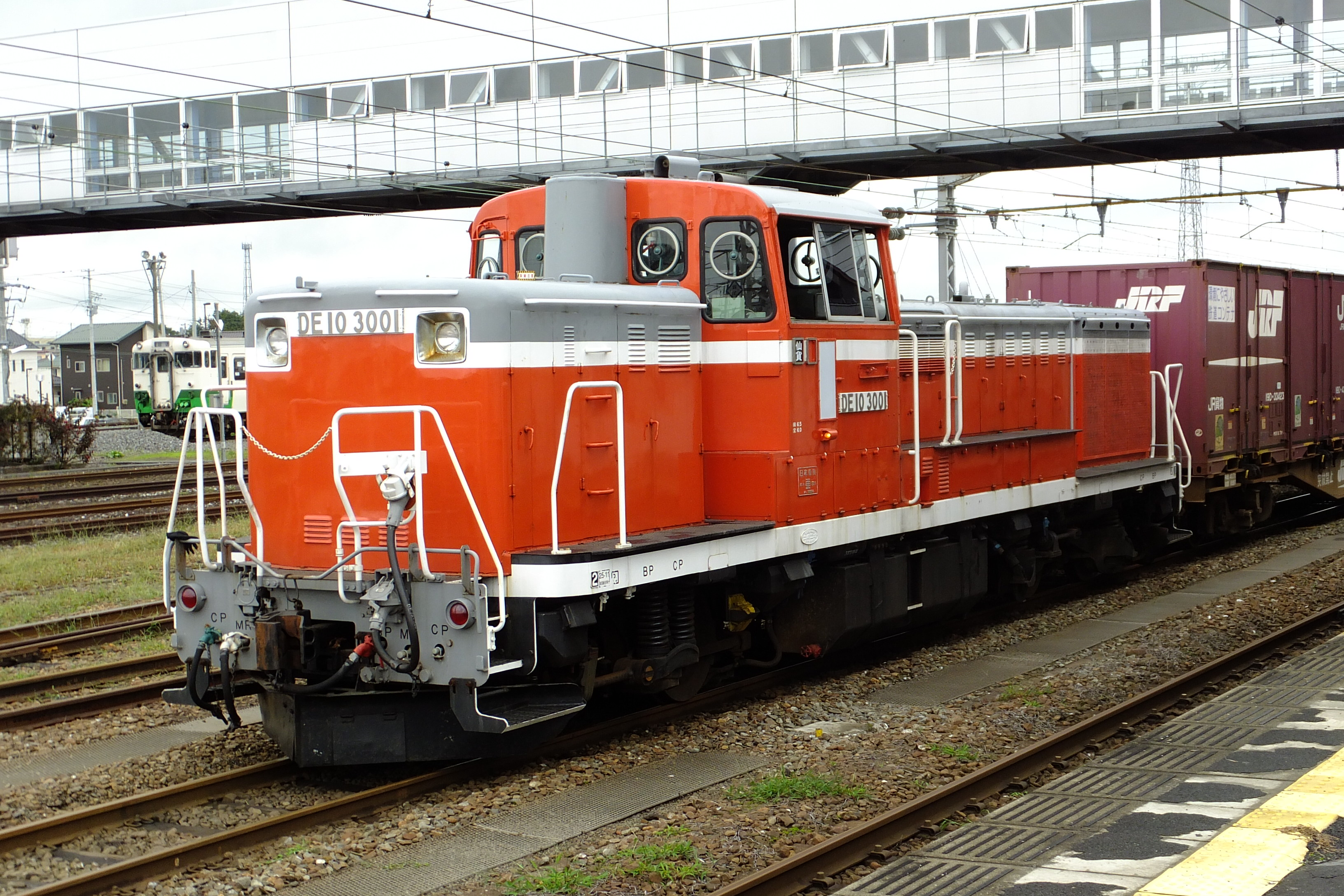
DE10 3001 in September 2015

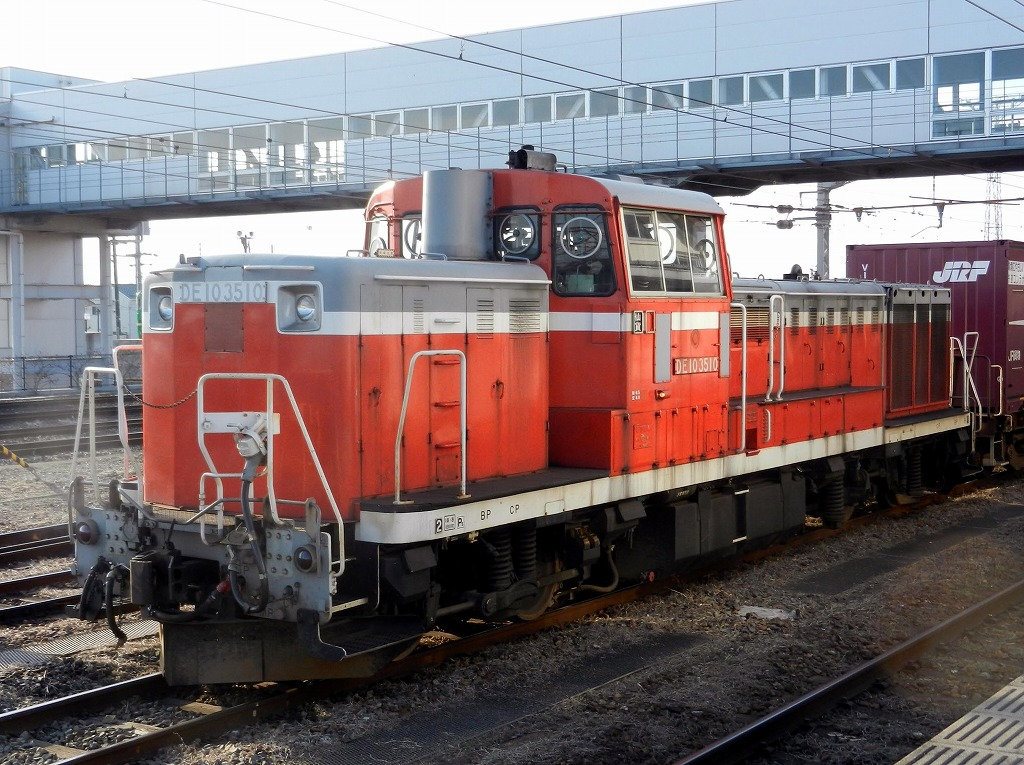
DE10 3510 in April 2013

JR Freight shunting locomotives rebuilt in 2009 from former JR East Class DE15 snow-plough locomotives. The conversion histories and former identities of this sub-class are as follows.

Loco No.	Former No.	Date built	Manufacturer	Date converted	Date withdrawn
DE10 3001	DE15 1001	6 December 1971	Nippon Sharyo	5 June 2009	
DE10 3501	DE15 1510	October 1973	Nippon Sharyo	8 May 2009	
DE10 3502	DE15 1516	16 December 1975	Nippon Sharyo	7 April 2009	25 November 2009
DE10 3503	DE15 2567 (Note: Originally built as DE15 1517.)	14 January 1976	Nippon Sharyo	29 May 2009	FY2011
DE10 3504	DE15 1522	2 March 1976	Nippon Sharyo	24 April 2009	FY2011
DE10 3505	DE15 1523	9 March 1976	Nippon Sharyo	6 April 2009	
DE10 3506	DE15 1529	4 October 1976	Kawasaki Heavy Industries	15 May 2009	
DE10 3507	DE15 1530	7 October 1976	Kawasaki Heavy Industries	24 June 2009	
DE10 3508	DE15 1536	9 September 1977	Kawasaki Heavy Industries	7 April 2009	
DE10 3509	DE15 2505	21 October 1977	Nippon Sharyo	18 May 2009	
DE10 3510	DE15 2506	28 October 1977	Nippon Sharyo	19 May 2009	
DE10 3511	DE15 1539	10 November 1978	Kawasaki Heavy Industries	23 April 2009	
DE10 3512	DE15 2513	15 November 1978	Kawasaki Heavy Industries	12 May 2009	
DE10 3513	DE15 2524	20 November 1980	Kawasaki Heavy Industries	27 April 2009	

== Preserved examples ==
- DE10 1: Previously stored at JR Shikoku Tadotsu depot, and scheduled to be preserved at the Shikoku Railway Heritage Museum from July 2014

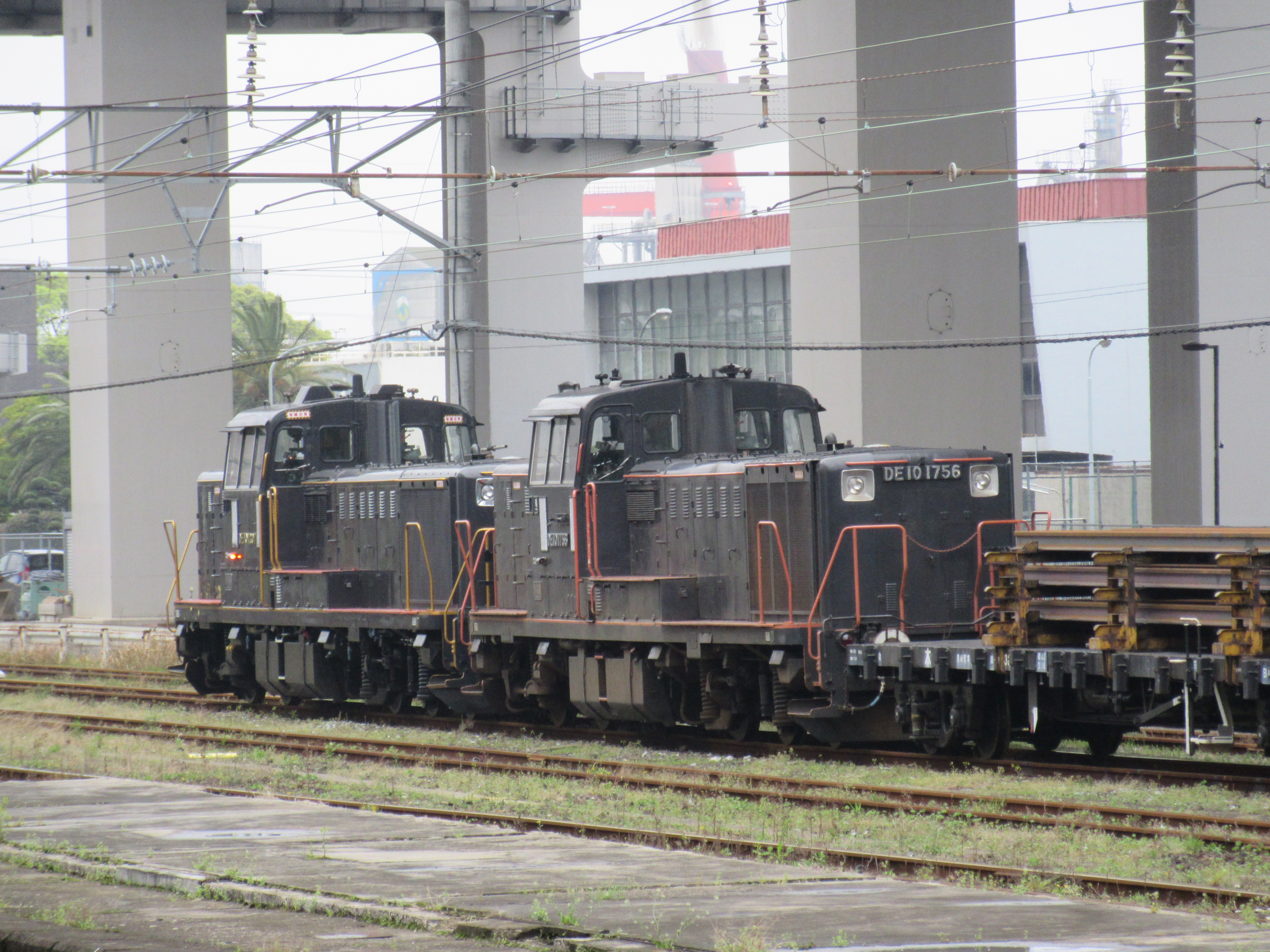
A pair of JR Kyushu Class DE10 diesel locomotives including DE10 1756

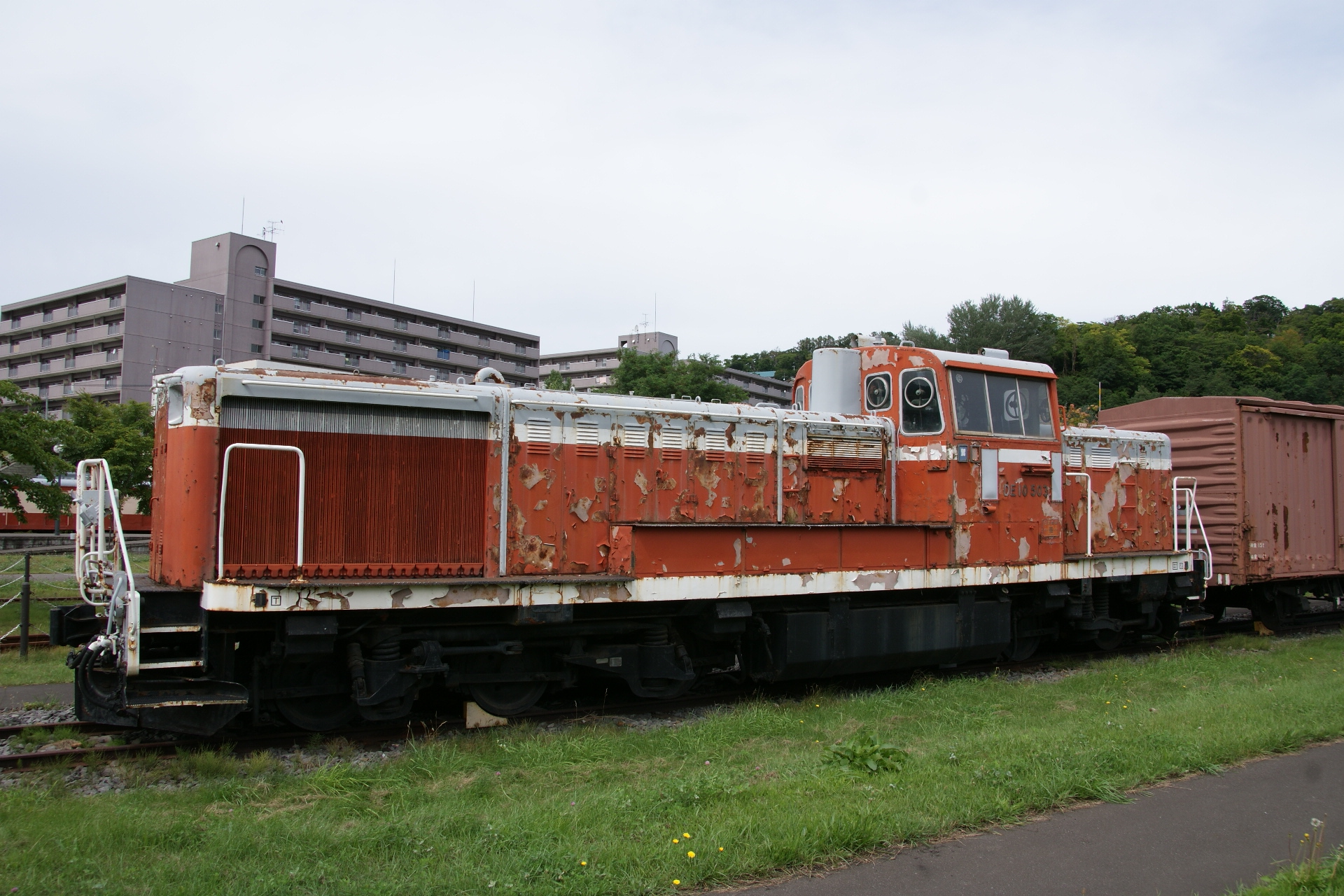
DE10 503 preserved at the Otaru Museum in Otaru, Hokkaido

== Related classes ==
- JNR Class DE11 heavy switcher locomotive
- JNR Class DE15 snowplough propulsion unit

== Classification ==
The DE10 classification for this locomotive type is explained below.

- D: Diesel locomotive
- E: Five driving axles
- 10: Locomotive with maximum speed less than 85 km/h (53 mph)
