= Japan Freight Railway Company =

Japanese railway company

- Native name: 日本貨物鉄道株式会社
- Romanized name: Nippon Kamotsu Tetsudō kabushiki gaisha
- Type: State-owned
- Predecessor: Japanese National Railways (JNR)
- Founded: 1 April 1987; 39 years ago (privatization of JNR)
- Headquarters: 5-33-8, Sendagaya, Shibuya, Tokyo, Japan
- Services: freight services other related services
- Owner: Japan Railway Construction, Transport and Technology Agency
- Number of employees: 5,472 (as of April 1, 2021)
- Website: www.jrfreight.co.jp/en

Japan Freight Railway Company (Japanese: 日本貨物鉄道株式会社, Hepburn: Nippon Kamotsu Tetsudō Kabushiki-gaisha), or JR Freight (JR貨物, Jeiāru Kamotsu), is one of the seven constituent companies of Japan Railways Group (JR Group). It provides transportation of cargo nationwide throughout Japan. Its headquarters are in Shibuya, Tokyo near Shinjuku Station.

The Japan Railways Group was founded on 1 April 1987, when Japanese National Railways (JNR) was privatized. Japanese National Railways was divided into six regional passenger rail companies and a single freight railway company, Japan Freight Railway Company.

== Economics ==
In 2017, only about 5% of all freight in Japan is carried by rail but nearly all of that, 99%, is carried by JR Freight. Trucks carry about 50% and ships about 44%. JR Freight has seen its share of the freight market gradually decrease since 1993. In the 2010s JR Freight has been carrying more freight because of the decrease in the number of available truck drivers due to age as well as government policy to reduce carbon dioxide. JR Freight has run a deficit for many years.

== Lines ==
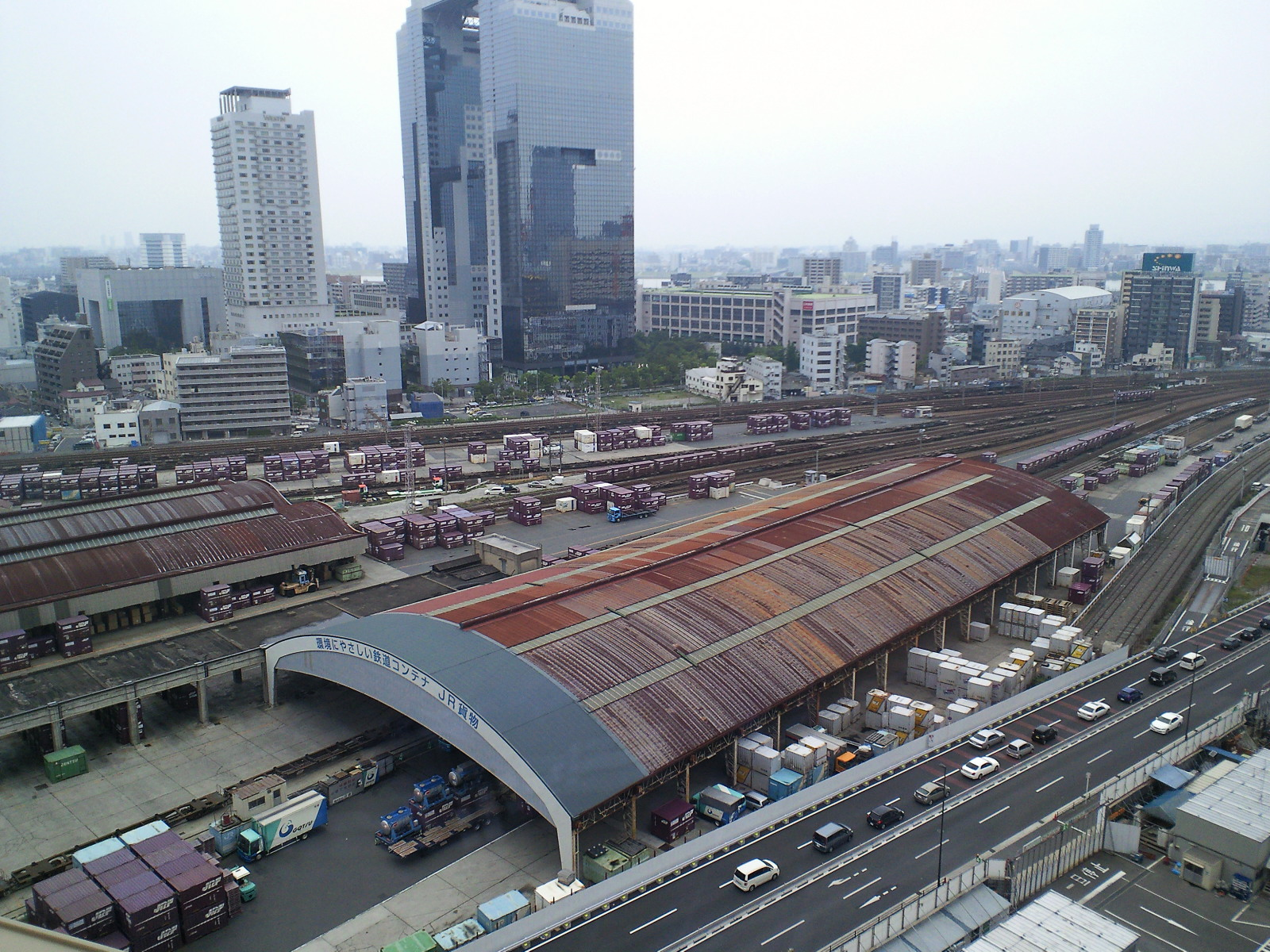
Umeda Freight Terminal in Osaka in June 2011

While major part of the operation of JR Freight is on the tracks owned and maintained by the other six JR Group railways, JR Freight owns 47.8 kilometres (29.7 mi) of track as follows:

Line	Endpoints	Locale	Distance (km)
Hokuriku	Tsuruga Station - Tsuruga-Minato Freight Terminal	Fukui	2.7
Kagoshima	Mojikō Station - Sotohama Freight Terminal	Fukuoka	0.9
Kagoshima	Chihaya Yard - Fukuoka Freight Terminal	Fukuoka	2.2
Kansai	Yokkaichi Station - Shiohama Station	Mie	3.3
Kansai	Hirano Station - Kudara Freight Terminal	Osaka	1.4
Nippō	Obase-Nishikōdai-mae Station - Kandakō Freight Terminal	Fukuoka	4.6
Ōu	Tsuchizaki Station - Akitakō Freight Terminal	Akita	1.8
Senseki	Rikuzen-Yamashita Station - Ishinomakikō Freight Terminal	Miyagi	1.8
Shin'etsu	Kami-Nuttari Junction - Nuttari Freight Terminal	Niigata	1.8
Shin'etsu	Kami-Nuttari Junction - Higashi-Niigatakō Freight Terminal	Niigata	3.8
Shinminato	Nōmachi Station - Takaoka Freight Terminal	Toyama	1.9
Tohoku	Tabata Freight Terminal - Kita-Ōji Freight Terminal	Tokyo	4.0
Tōkaidō	Sannō Junction - Nagoya-Minato Freight Terminal	Aichi	6.2
Tōkaidō	Suita Freight Terminal - Osaka Freight Terminal	Osaka	8.7
Uetsu	Sakata Station - Sakatakō Freight Terminal	Yamagata	2.7

== Rolling stock ==
As of 1 March 2017, JR Freight owns and operates the following rolling stock:

Locomotive	Image	Arrangement	Power type	Introduced	In service
JNR Class DE10		B-C	diesel-hydraulic	1966	138
JNR Class DE11		B-C	diesel-hydraulic	1968	10
JR Freight Class DB500		B	diesel-hydraulic	2016	7
JR Freight Class DD200		Bo-Bo	diesel-electric	2017	20
JR Freight Class DF200		Bo-Bo-Bo	diesel-electric	1992	48
JR Freight Class HD300		Bo-Bo	hybrid diesel-battery	2010	32
JNR Class ED76		Bo-2-Bo	AC electric	1965	10
JNR Class EF64		Bo-Bo-Bo	DC electric	1964	132
JNR Class EF65		Bo-Bo-Bo	DC electric	1965	52
JNR Class EF66		Bo-Bo-Bo	DC electric	1966	39
JNR Class EF67		Bo-Bo-Bo	DC electric	1982	8
JNR Class EF81		Bo-Bo-Bo	AC/DC electric	1968	44
JR Freight Class EH200		Bo-Bo+Bo-Bo	DC electric	2002	25
JR Freight Class EF210		Bo-Bo-Bo	DC electric	2016	101
JR Freight Class EH500		Bo-Bo+Bo-Bo	AC/DC electric	1997	82
JR Freight Class EF510		Bo-Bo-Bo	AC/DC electric	2001	40
JR Freight Class EH800		Bo-Bo+Bo-Bo	AC electric	2012	20
M250 series		—N/a	electric multiple unit	2004	16

=== Former rolling stock ===
- JNR Class ED62 Bo-1-Bo DC electric locomotives
- JNR Class ED75 Bo-Bo AC electric locomotives
- JNR Class ED79 Bo-Bo AC electric locomotives
- JR Freight Class EF200 Bo-Bo-Bo DC electric locomotives
- JNR Class DD51 B-2-B diesel-hydraulic locomotives
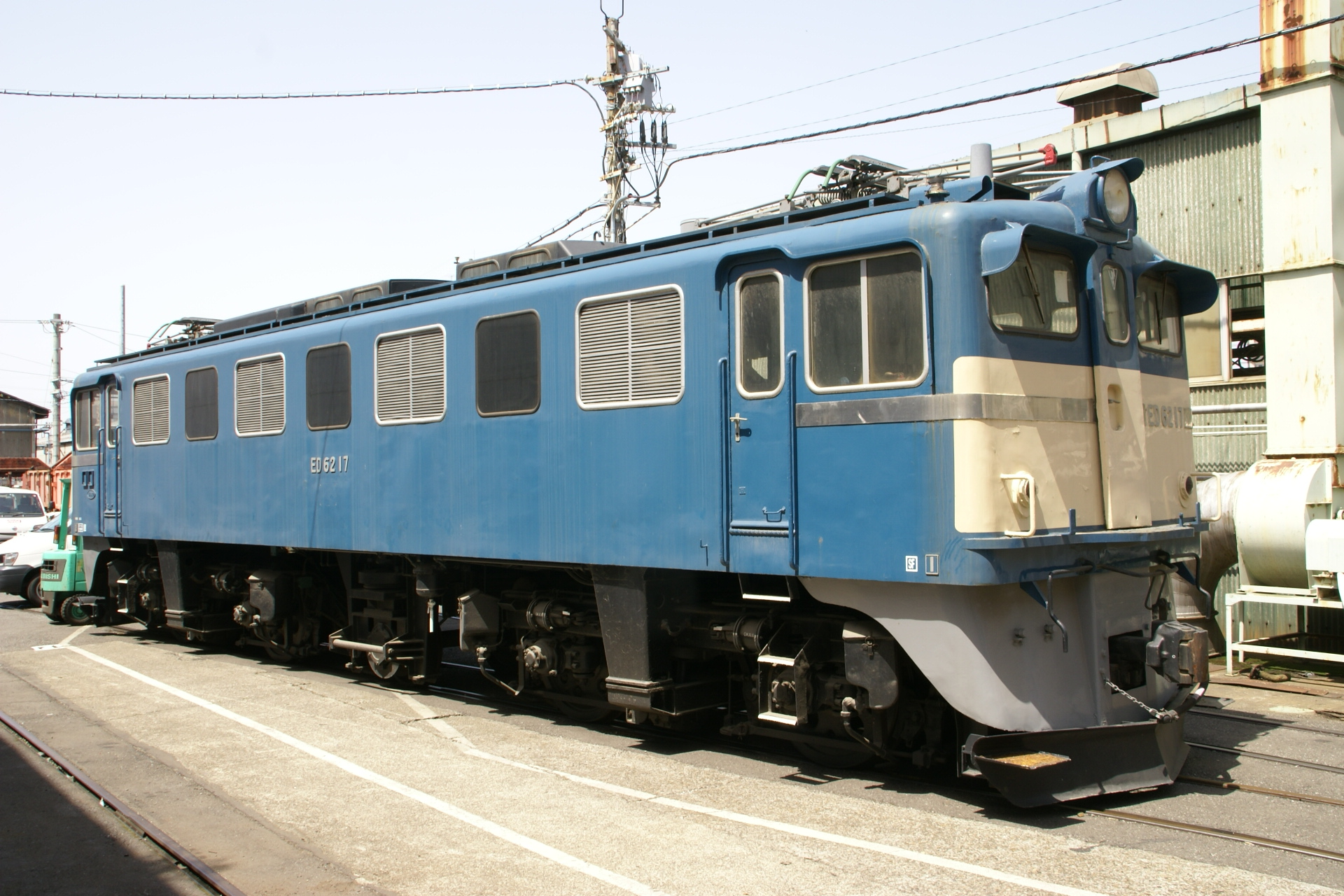
A Class ED62 electric locomotive in May 2007

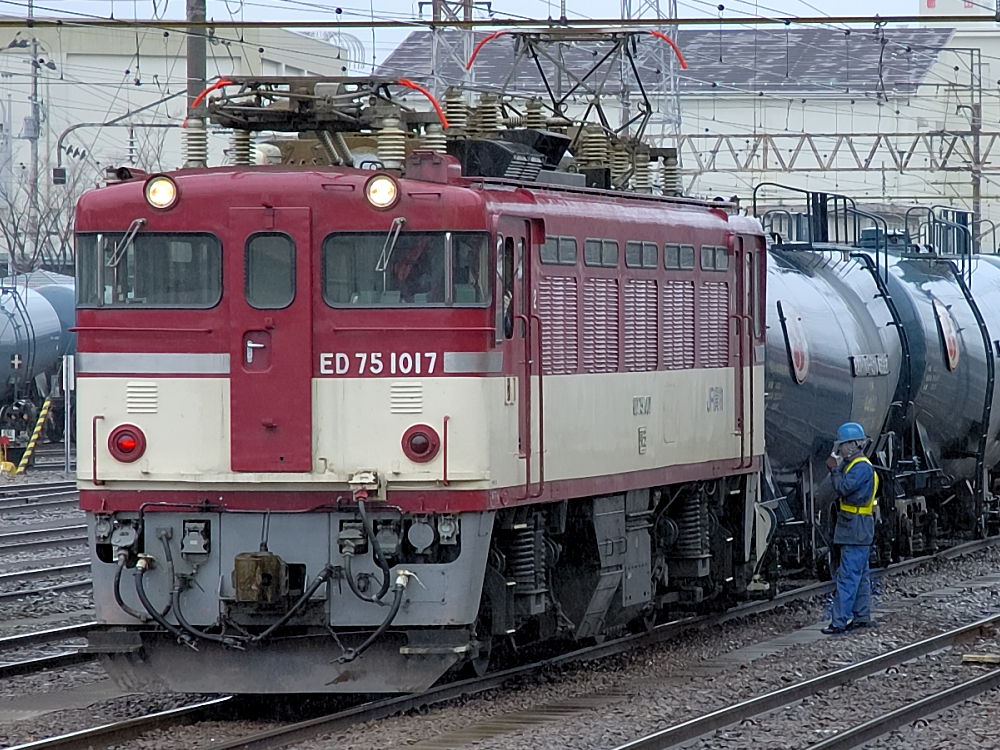
A Class ED75-1000 electric locomotive in March 2007

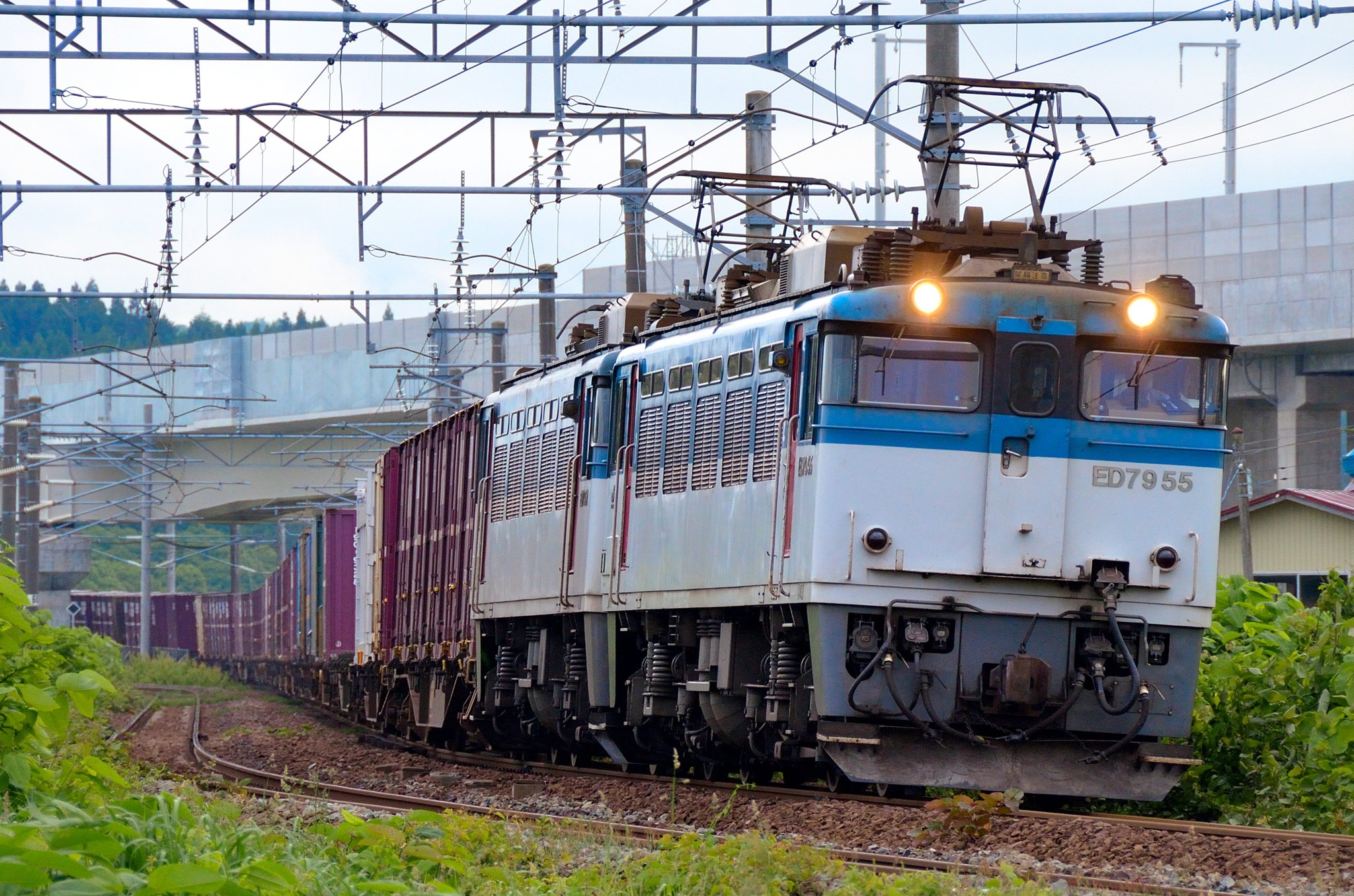
A pair of Class ED79 electric locomotives in June 2013

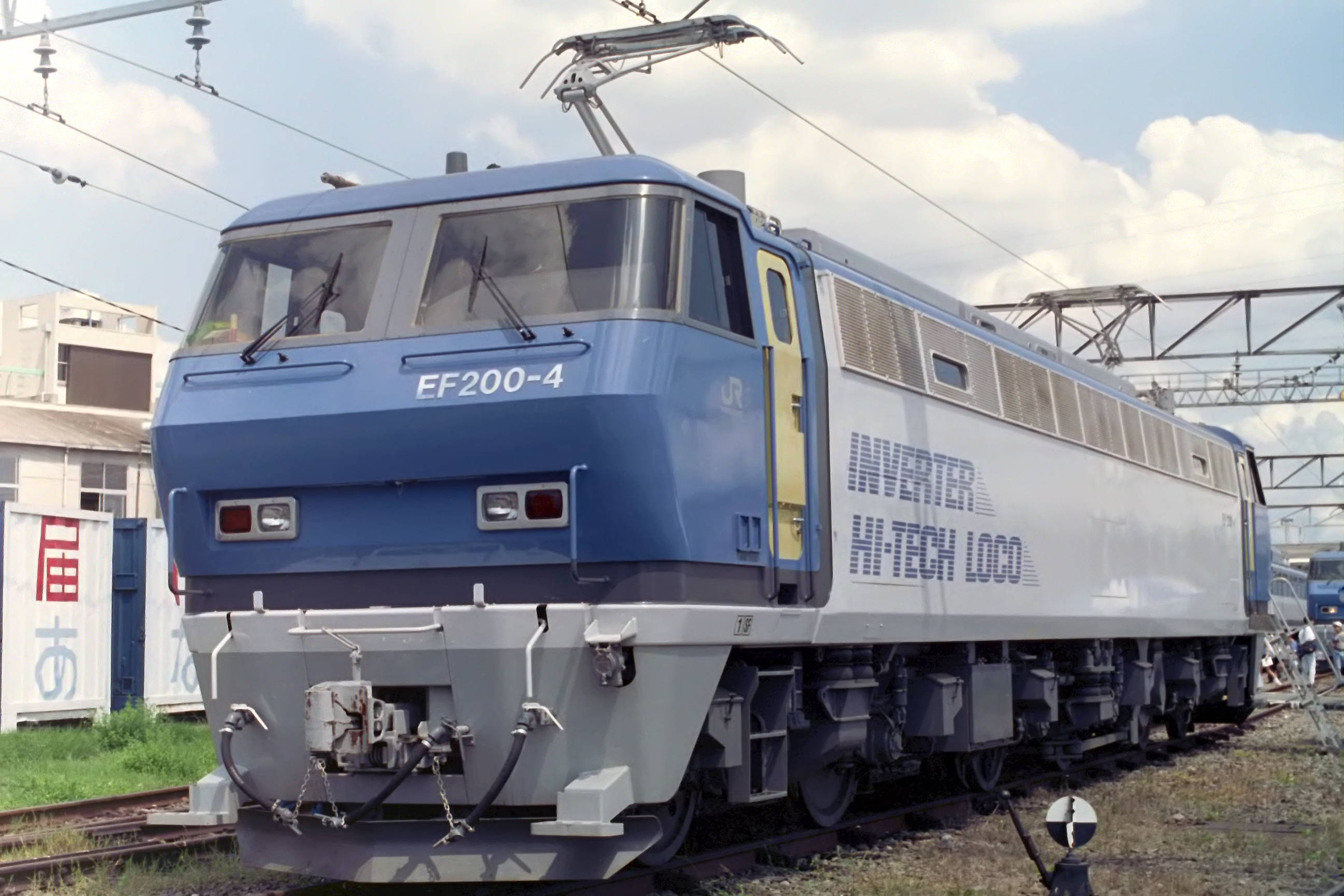
A Class EF200 DC electric locomotive in August 1992

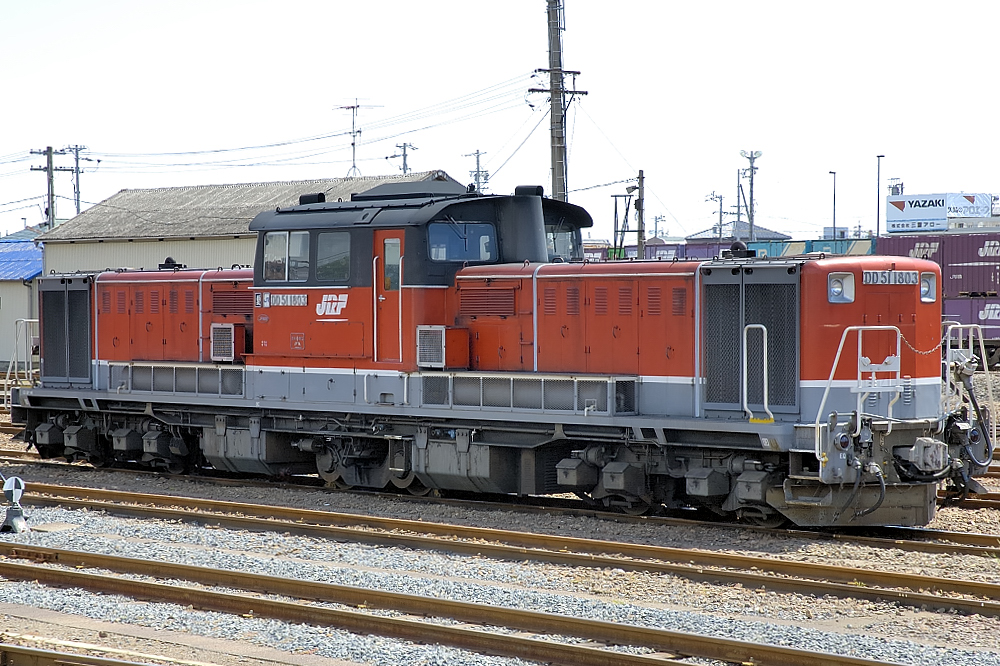
A Class DD51 diesel-hydraulic locomotive in August 2007

== See also ==
- Japan Railways locomotive numbering and classification
