= JR Freight Class EH200 =

Japanese electric locomotive type

Class EH200
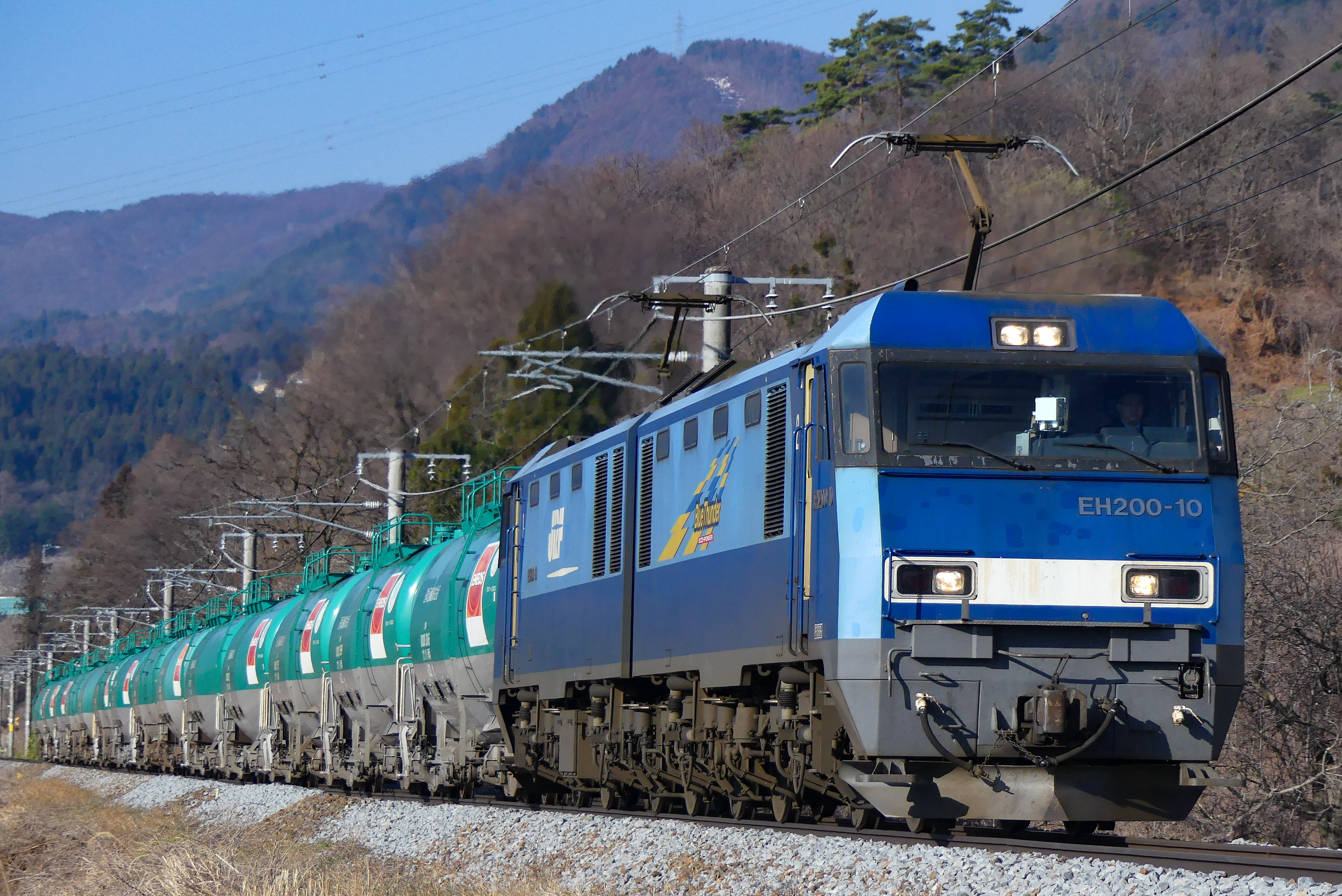
- EH200-10 on the Shinonoi Line in March 2018
Type and origin
- Power type: Electric
- Builder: Toshiba Infrastructure Systems & Solutions
- Build date: 2001–
Specifications
- Configuration
  - UIC: Bo′Bo′+Bo′Bo′
- Gauge: 1,067 mm (3 ft 6 in)
- Length: 25,000 mm (82 ft 1/4 in)
- Width: 2,948 mm (9 ft 8 1/8 in)
- Height: 3,960 mm (12 ft 11 7/8 in)
- Loco weight: 134.4 t (132.3 long tons; 148.2 short tons)
- Electric system/s: 1,500 V DC overhead wire
- Current pickup: pantograph
- Traction motors: AC
- Loco brake: Air and electrical regenerative
- Train brakes: Air
- Safety systems: ATS-SF
Performance figures
- Maximum speed: 110 km/h (70 mph)
- Power output: 4,520 kW (6,060 hp)
- Tractive effort: 271.8 kN (61,100 lb_{f})
Career
- Operators: JR Freight
- Number in class: 25
- Delivered: 2001
- Disposition: In operation

The Class EH200 (EH200形) is a Bo′Bo′+Bo′Bo′ wheel arrangement twin unit DC electric freight locomotive operated by JR Freight in Japan since 2001.

== Operations ==
The locomotives are built at the Toshiba factory in Fuchū, Tokyo. They are all based at Takasaki depot, and are primarily used on oil tank trains north of Tokyo and on the steeply-graded Chūō Main Line, Shinonoi Line, and Joetsu Line, replacing pairs of Class EF64s.

As of 1 March 2017, 25 Class EH200 locomotives are in service (EH200-901 and EH200-1 to EH200-24).

== Variants ==
- EH200-900: Prototype locomotive EH200-901, built 2001
- EH200-0: Full-production locomotives built from 2003 onward

== EH200-901 prototype ==
The pre-production prototype, EH200-901, was delivered to Takasaki depot in 2001, and entered revenue service in October 2002 following extensive testing.

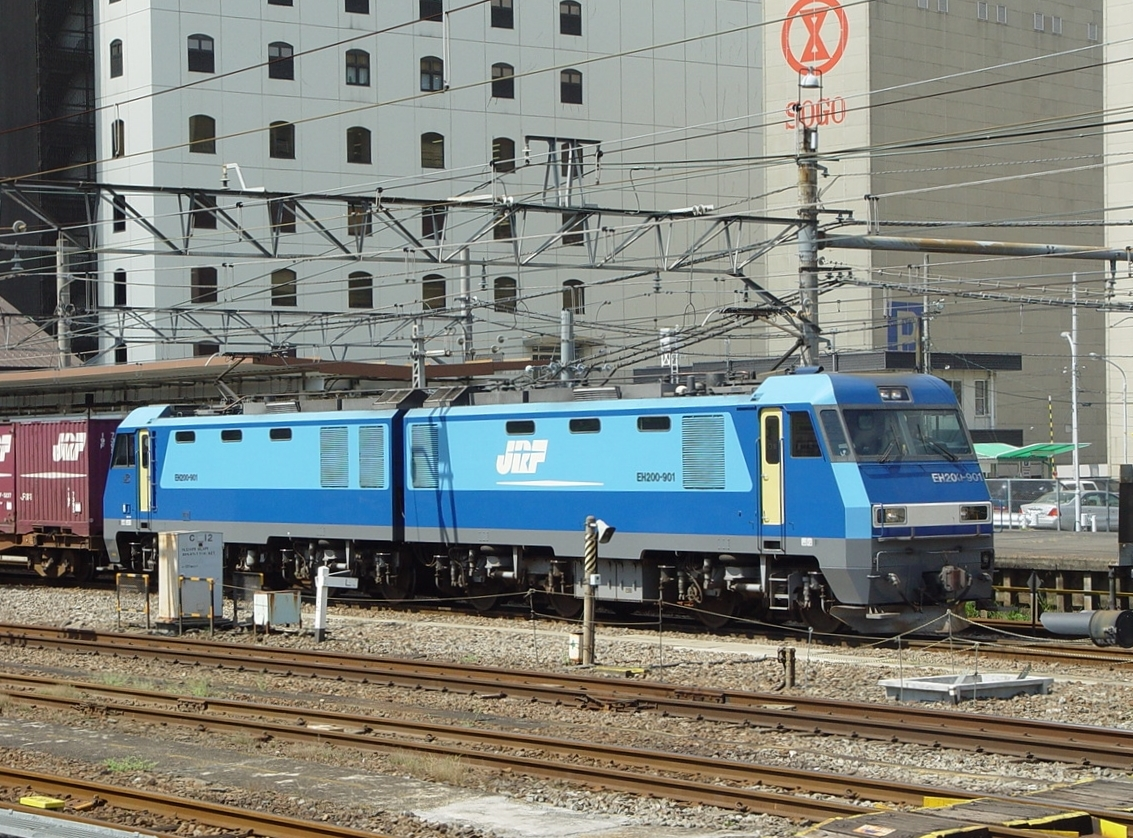
Prototype EH200-901 at Hachiōji station in September 2003

== EH200-0 full-production version ==
Following evaluation of the prototype version, the first full-production locomotive, EH200-1, was delivered to Takasaki in March 2003. A number of minor improvements were incorporated, with the main external differences from the prototype being as follows.

- Elimination of centre pillar in the cab windscreens
- Redesigned windscreen wipers
- "Blue Thunder" logo on bodyside
- Reduced size white "JRF" logo on the body side
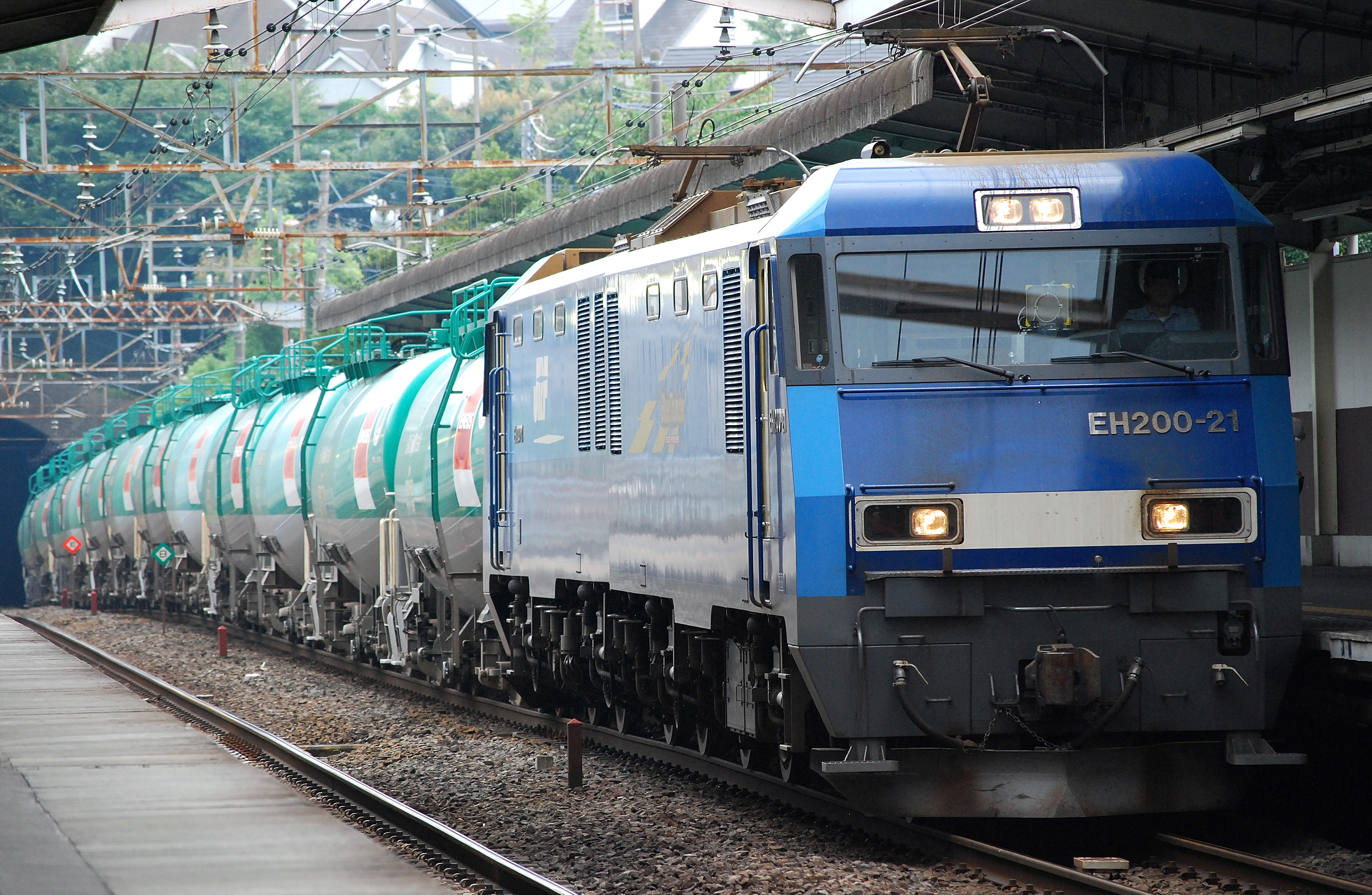
EH200-21 in September 2010

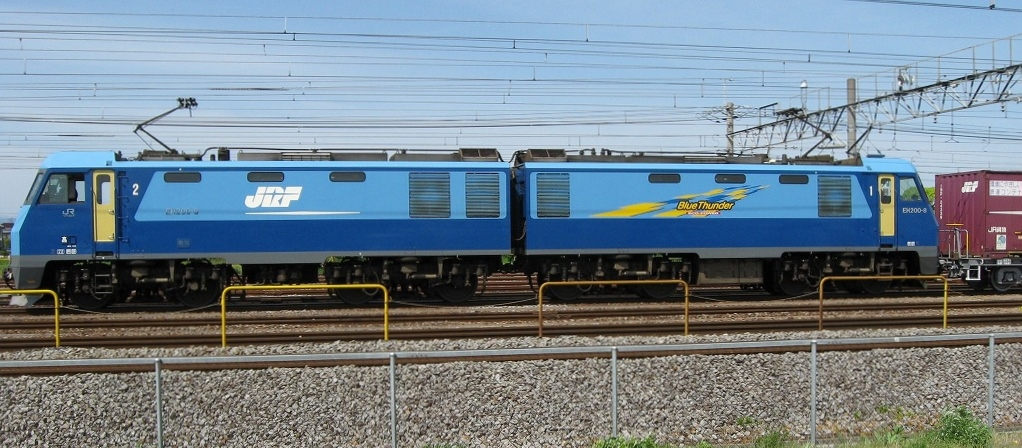
Side view of EH200-8 in May 2010

== Classification ==
The EH200 classification for this locomotive type is explained below. As with previous locomotive designs, the prototype is numbered EH200-901, with subsequent production locomotives numbered from EH200-1 onward.

- E: Electric locomotive
- H: Eight driving axles
- 200: DC locomotive with AC motors

== See also ==
- JNR Class EH10
- JR Freight Class EH500
- JR Freight Class EH800
