= JNR Class EH10 =

Japanese electric locomotive class

Class EH10
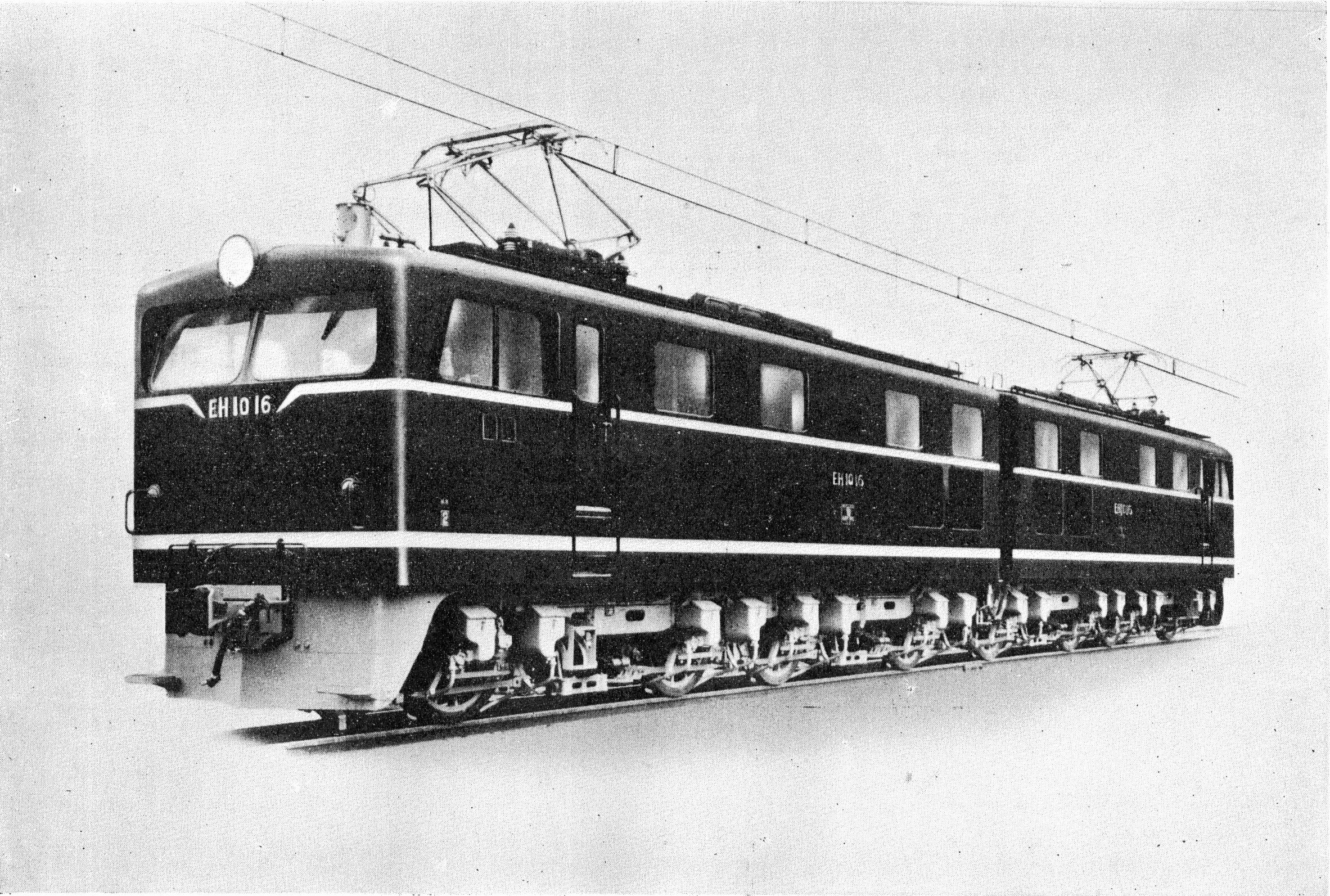
- EH10 16
Type and origin
- Power type: Electric
- Builder: Toshiba, Kawasaki, Mitsubishi Heavy Industries, Hitachi
- Build date: 1954-1957
Specifications
- Configuration
  - UIC: Bo′Bo′+Bo′Bo′
- Gauge: 1,067 mm (3 ft 6 in)
- Length: 22,500 mm (73 ft 10 in)
- Width: 2,800 mm (9 ft 2 in)
- Height: 3,960 mm (13 ft 0 in)
- Loco weight: 116 tons
- Electric system/s: 1,500 V DC
- Traction motors: DC
Performance figures
- Maximum speed: 110 km/h (70 mph)
- Power output: 2,530 kW (3,390 hp)
- Tractive effort: 191.0 kN (42,900 lbf)
Career
- Operators: Japanese National Railways
- Number in class: 64
- Disposition: All withdrawn

The EH10 class of electric locomotives were Bo′Bo′+Bo′Bo′ wheel arrangement two-unit DC freight locomotives operated by Japanese National Railways (JNR) in Japan from 1954 until 1982.

The exterior was designed by industrial designer Masao Hagiwara.

The EH10 was used for 1,200 tonne freight trains on the Tōkaidō Main Line between Tokyo (Shiodome) and Osaka (Umeda).

== Preserved examples ==
One example, EH10 61, is preserved at Higashi-Awaji Minami Park in Osaka.

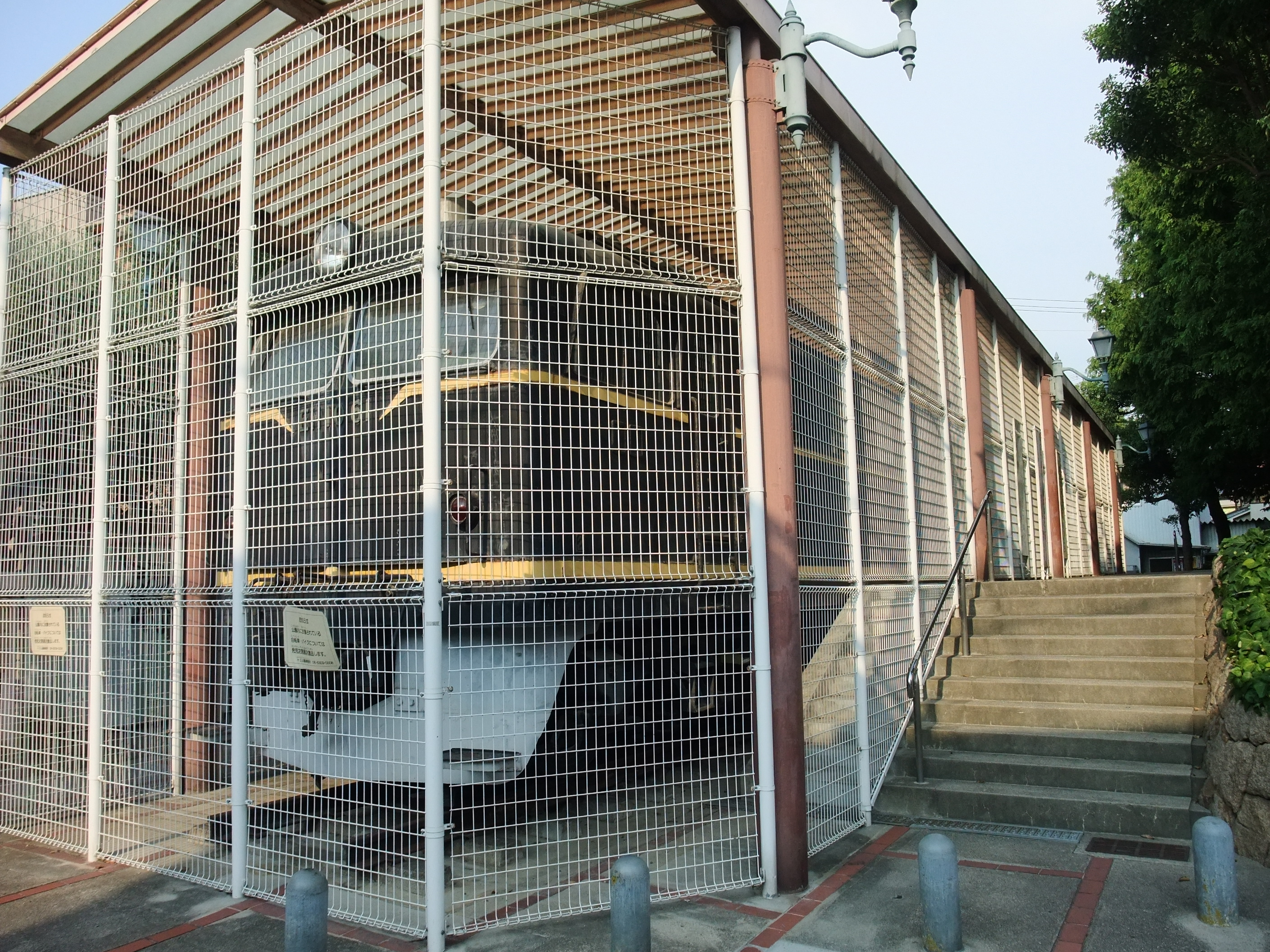
Preserved EH10 61 in August 2013.

== Classification ==
The EH0 classification for this locomotive type is explained below.

- E: Electric locomotive
- H: Eight driving axles
- 10: Locomotive with a maximum speed of 85 km/h or less

== See also ==
- JR Freight Class EH200
- JR Freight Class EH500
- JR Freight Class EH800
