= JR Freight Class DB500 =

Diesel-hydraulic locomotive type operated in Japan

Class DB500
Type and origin
- Power type: Diesel-hydraulic
- Builder: Hokuriku Heavy Industries
- Build date: 2016
Specifications
- Configuration
  - Whyte: 4wDH
  - UIC: B
- Gauge: 1,067 mm (3 ft 6 in)
- Length: 7,650 mm (25 ft 1 1/8 in)
- Width: 2,824 mm (9 ft 3 1/8 in)
- Height: 3,670 mm (12 ft 1/2 in)
- Axle load: 13.45 t (13.24 long tons; 14.83 short tons)
- Loco weight: 26.9 t (26.5 long tons; 29.7 short tons)
- Fuel type: Diesel
- Engine type: 4-cycle, straight-six engine, water-cooled
- Cylinders: 6
- Safety systems: ATS-SF
Performance figures
- Maximum speed: 25 km/h (15 mph)
- Power output: 184 kW (247 hp) @2,000 rpm
- Tractive effort: 66 kN (15,000 lb_{f})
Career
- Operators: JR Freight
- Number in class: 4
- Numbers: DB500-1 DB500-4
- Delivered: 2016
- First run: 4 March 2017
- Disposition: In service

The Class DB500 (DB500形) is a B wheel arrangement two-axle diesel-hydraulic locomotive type operated by Japan Freight Railway (JR Freight) on shunting duties in Japan since March 2017.

== Overview ==
The Class DB500 was developed to replace ageing Class DE10 diesel-hydraulic locomotives used for shunting duties at smaller freight terminals such as Shimonoseki in Yamaguchi Prefecture. The locomotive has a single water-cooled four-cycle straight six-cylinder diesel engine, with a power output of 184 kW (247 hp), sufficient to haul 500-tonne (490-long-ton; 550-short-ton) trains.

== History ==
The Class DB500 entered service at Shimonoseki Freight Terminal from the start of the revised timetable on 4 March 2017.

== Classification ==
The DB500 classification for this locomotive type is explained below.

- D: Diesel locomotive
- B: Two driving axles
- 500: Diesel-hydraulic locomotive
