= JR Freight Class EH500 =

Japanese electric locomotive type

Class EH500
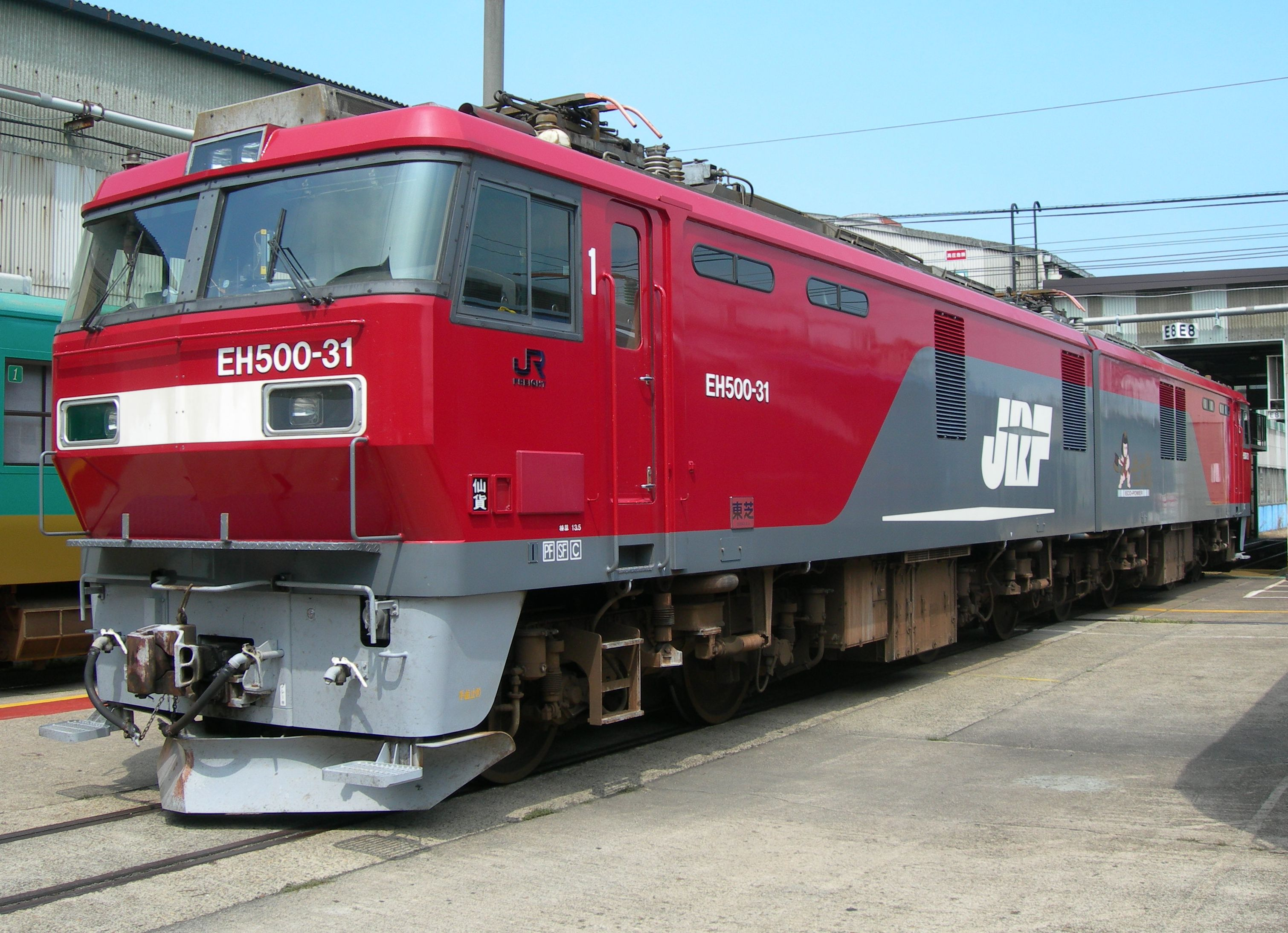
- EH500-31 at Koriyama Rolling Stock Centre in August 2010
Type and origin
- Power type: Electric
- Builder: Toshiba
- Build date: 1997–
Specifications
- Configuration
  - UIC: Bo′Bo′+Bo′Bo′
- Gauge: 1,067 mm (3 ft 6 in)
- Length: 25,000 mm (82 ft 1/4 in)
- Width: 2,950 mm (9 ft 8 1/8 in)
- Height: 3,917 mm (12 ft 10 1/4 in)
- Loco weight: 134.2 t (132.1 long tons; 147.9 short tons)
- Electric system/s: 1,500 V DC & 20 kV AC at 50/60 Hz overhead wire
- Current pickup: pantograph
- Traction motors: AC
- Transmission: Electric
- MU working: Within Class Only
- Loco brake: Air and Electrical regenerative
- Train brakes: Air
- Safety systems: ATS-SF
Performance figures
- Maximum speed: 110 km/h (70 mph)
- Power output: 4 MW (5,400 hp)
- Tractive effort: 24,551 kgf (240,760 N; 54,130 lbf)
Career
- Operators: JR Freight
- Number in class: 82 (as of 1 March 2017)
- Delivered: September 1997
- Disposition: Operational

The Class EH500 (EH500形) is a Bo′Bo′+Bo′Bo′ wheel arrangement multi-system AC/DC two-unit electric locomotive type operated by JR Freight in Japan since 1997.

== Operations ==
The locomotives are built at the Toshiba factory in Fuchū, Tokyo. Initially, they were all based at Sendai depot for use on long-distance container trains from the Tokyo area to Hokkaido via the Tohoku Main Line, replacing DC Class EF65s south of Kuroiso, pairs of AC Class ED75s north of Kuroiso, and pairs of AC Class ED79s through the Seikan Tunnel.

In 2004, locomotives EH500-25 and EH500-27 were loaned in turn to Moji depot in Kitakyushu for trials. From 2007, a number of EH500s were transferred to Moji depot for use on 1,300 tonne freight trains between Honshu and Kyushu through the Kanmon Tunnel, replacing ageing AC Class ED76s and dual-voltage EF81-300s and EF81-400s.

As of 1 April 2013, the fleet totalled 82 locomotives (EH500-901 and EH500-1 to EH500-81). 12 locomotives, EH500-45 to EH500-50 and EH500-67 to EH500-72, are based at Moji Depot, and the other 70 members of the class are based at Sendai.

== Variants ==
- EH500-901: Prototype
- EH500-1 – 2: Pre-series 1st batch
- EH500-3 – 9: Full-production 2nd batch
- EH500-10 –: 3rd batch

== EH500-901 ==
The prototype, EH500-901, was delivered to Sendai depot in September 1997 for extensive testing on the Tohoku Main Line and Kaikyo Line until March 1999. The livery is red and grey with black cab surrounds. It joined the rest of the Class EH500 fleet for use on revenue services from the start of the March 2000 timetable revision. "Kintaro Eco-Power" logos were added to the sides from December 2002.

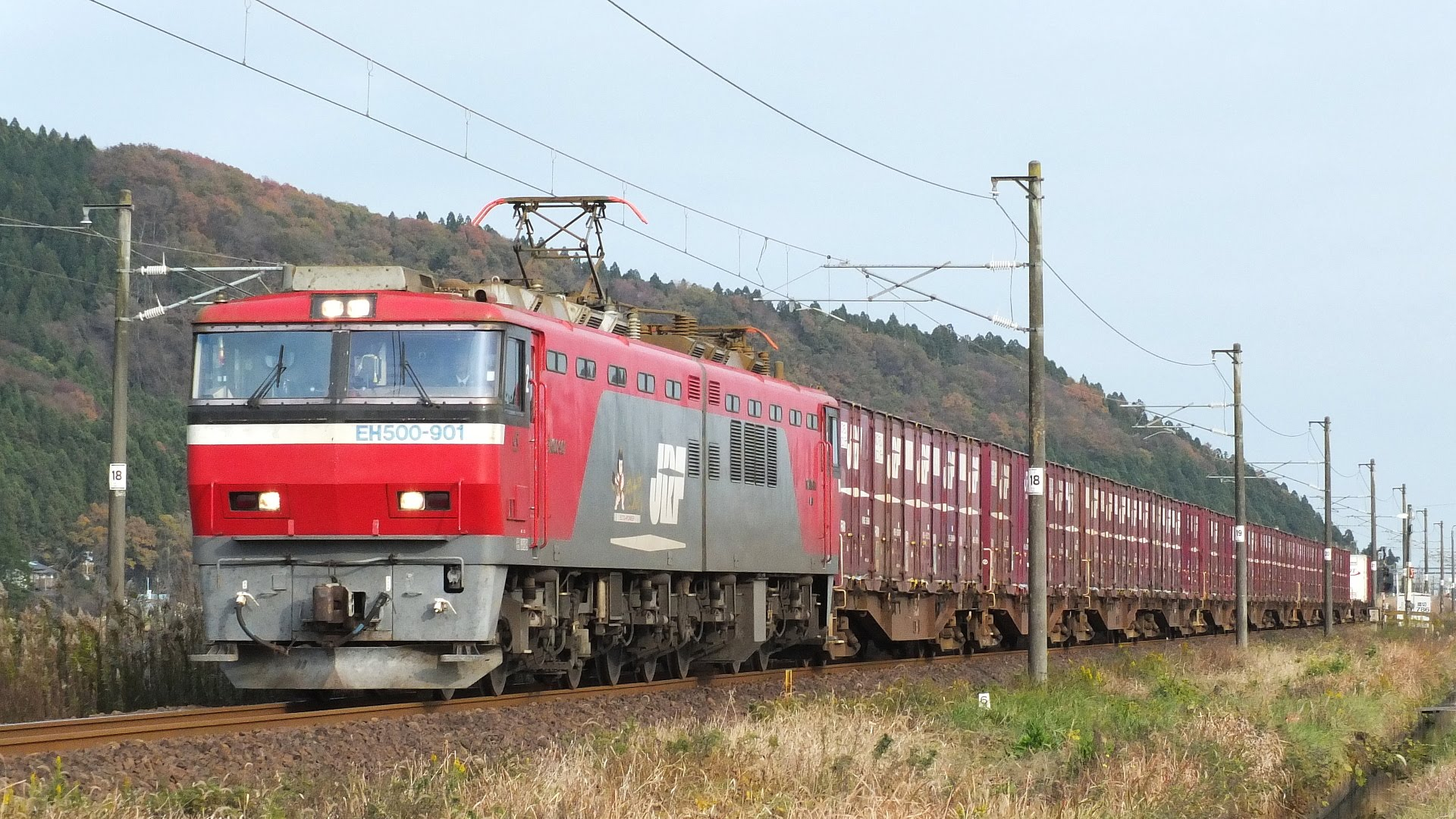
Prototype EH500-901 in November 2015

== 1st batch: EH500-1 and EH500-2 ==
Two pre-series locomotives, EH500-1 and EH500-2, were delivered in March 2000. These locomotives are finished in a livery of maroon and grey with black cab surrounds.

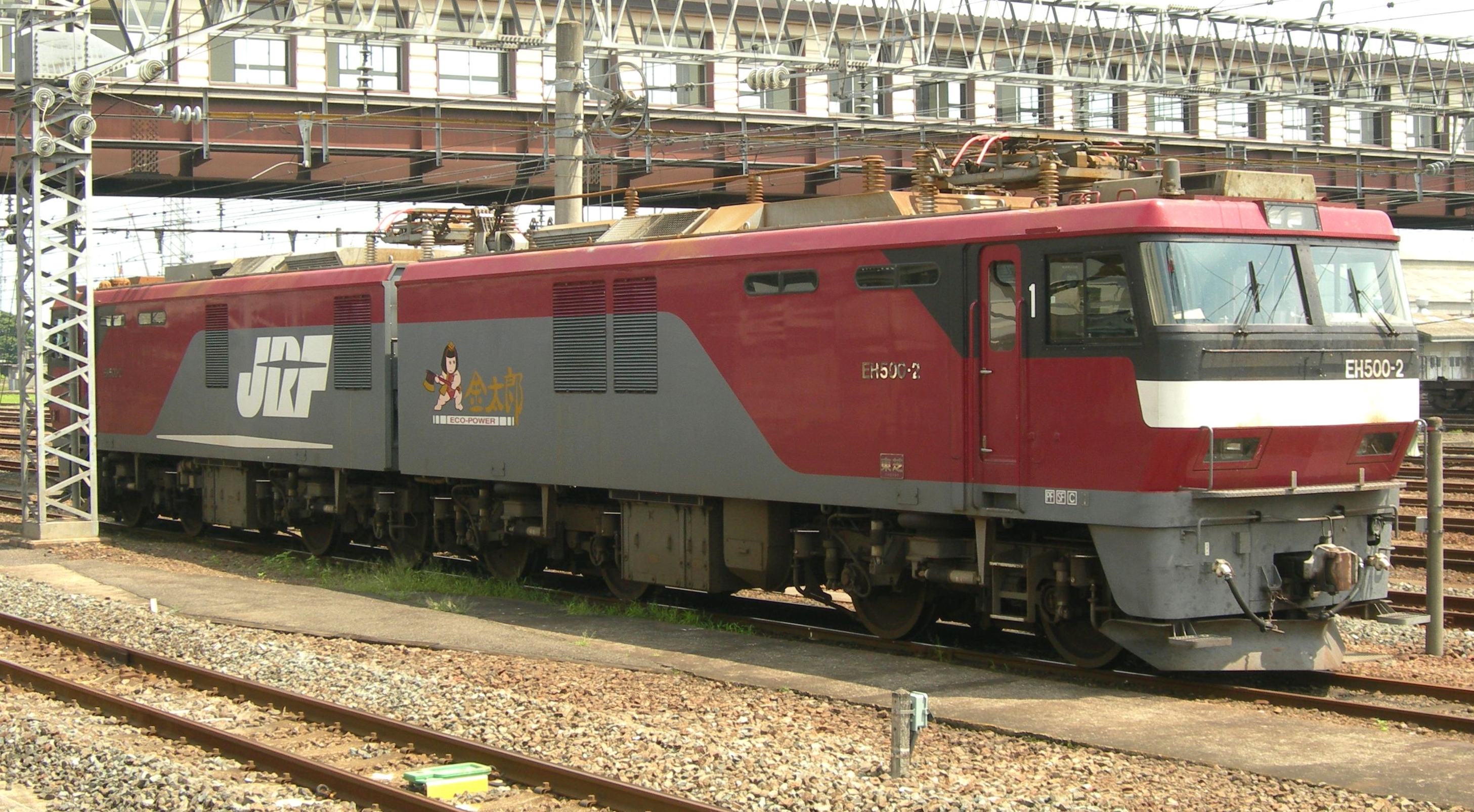
EH500-2 in August 2011

== 2nd batch: EH500-3 to EH500-9 ==
Built from March 2000 to January 2001. The headlamps were moved to a higher position to reduce problems of blockage by snow. New "Kintaro Eco-Power" logos were added to the sides.

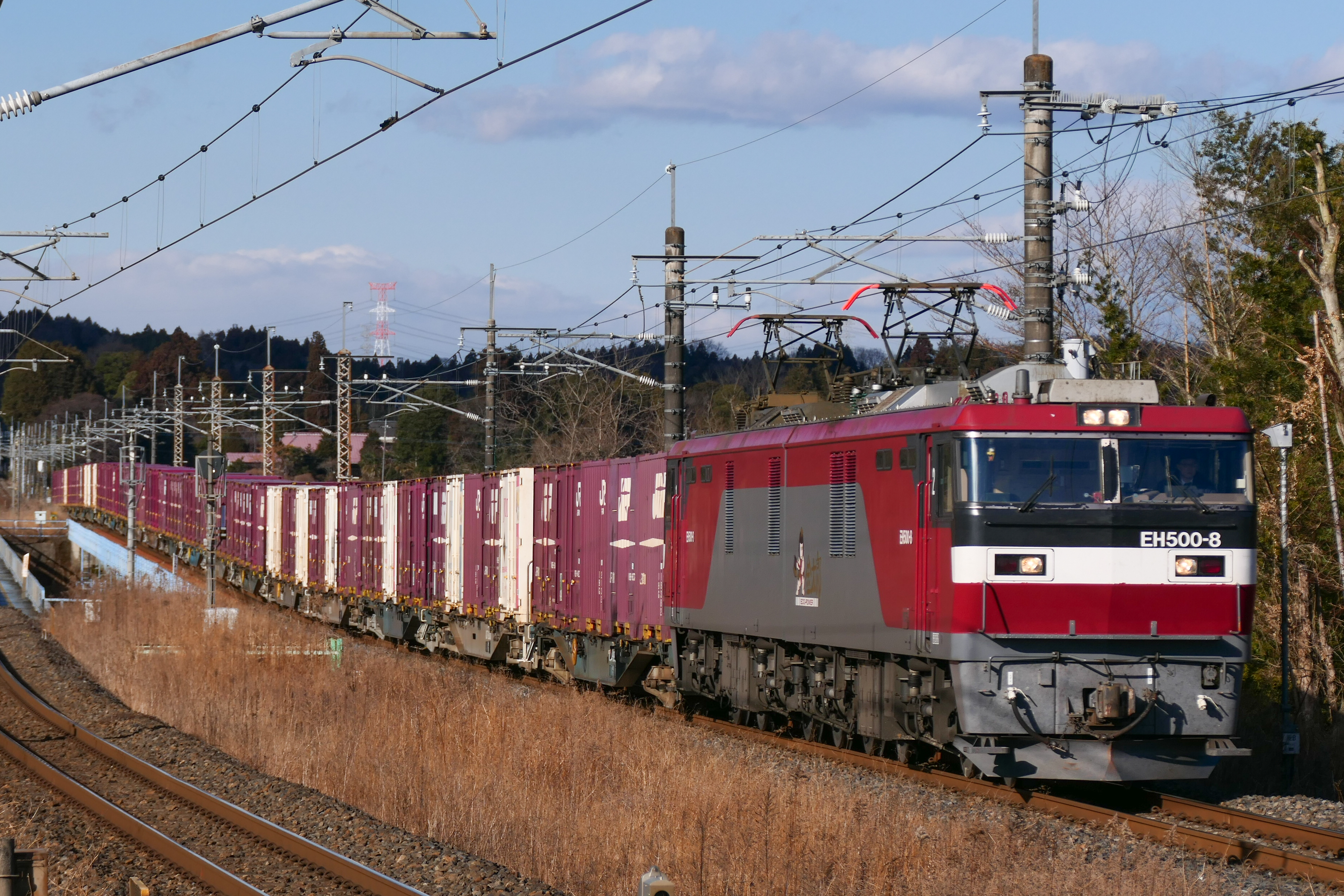
EH500-8 in February 2022

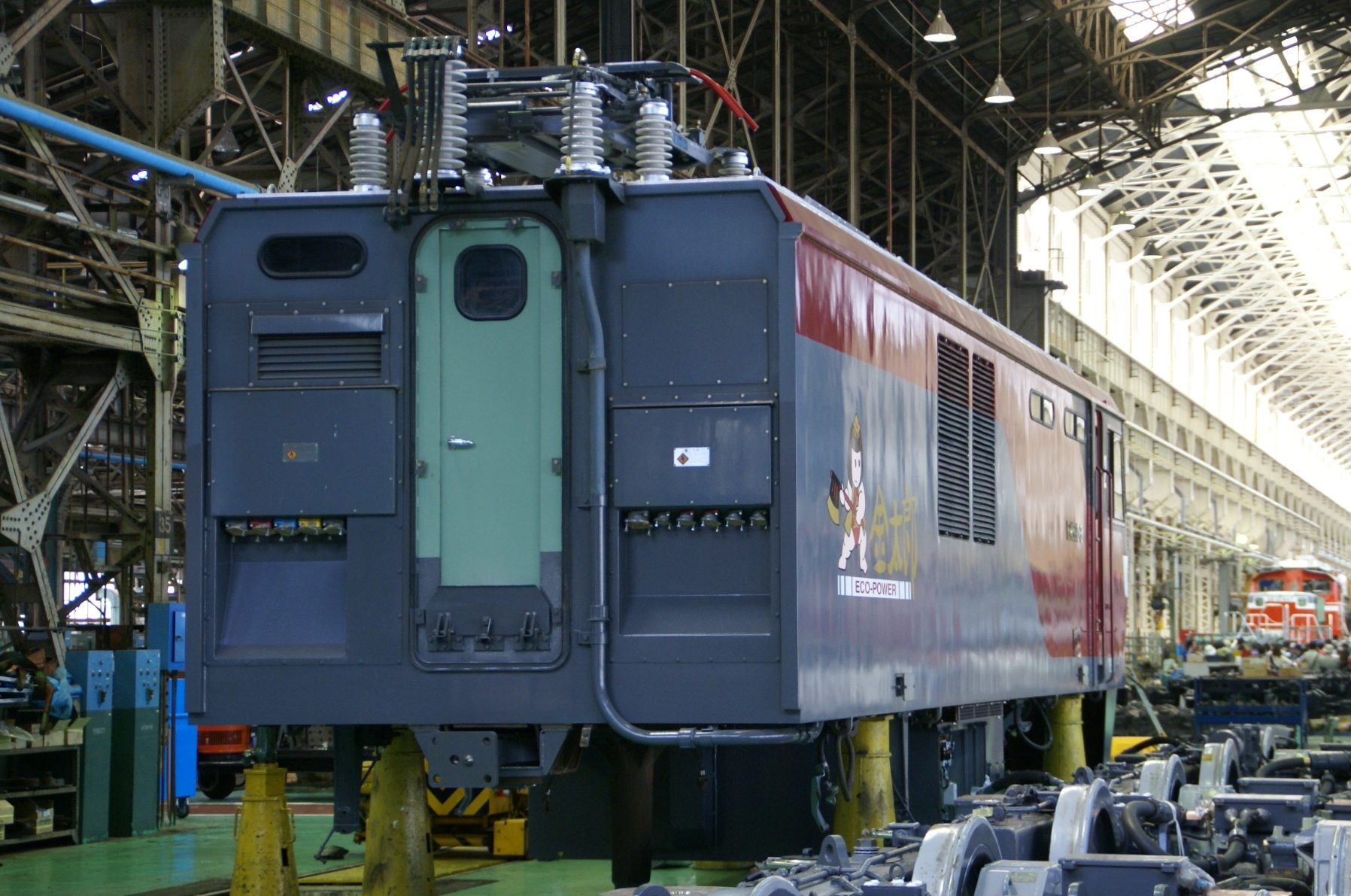
Inner end of EH500-3 undergoing overhaul in May 2007

== 3rd batch: EH500-10 onward ==
Locomotives from EH500-10 (delivered in August 2001) onward are painted in a revised colour scheme using bright red instead of the earlier maroon colour. The black colour around the cab windows was also discontinued. Locomotives numbered EH500-15 onwards have narrower surrounds on the front-end headlight boxes, and the front-end white band is also correspondingly slightly thinner.

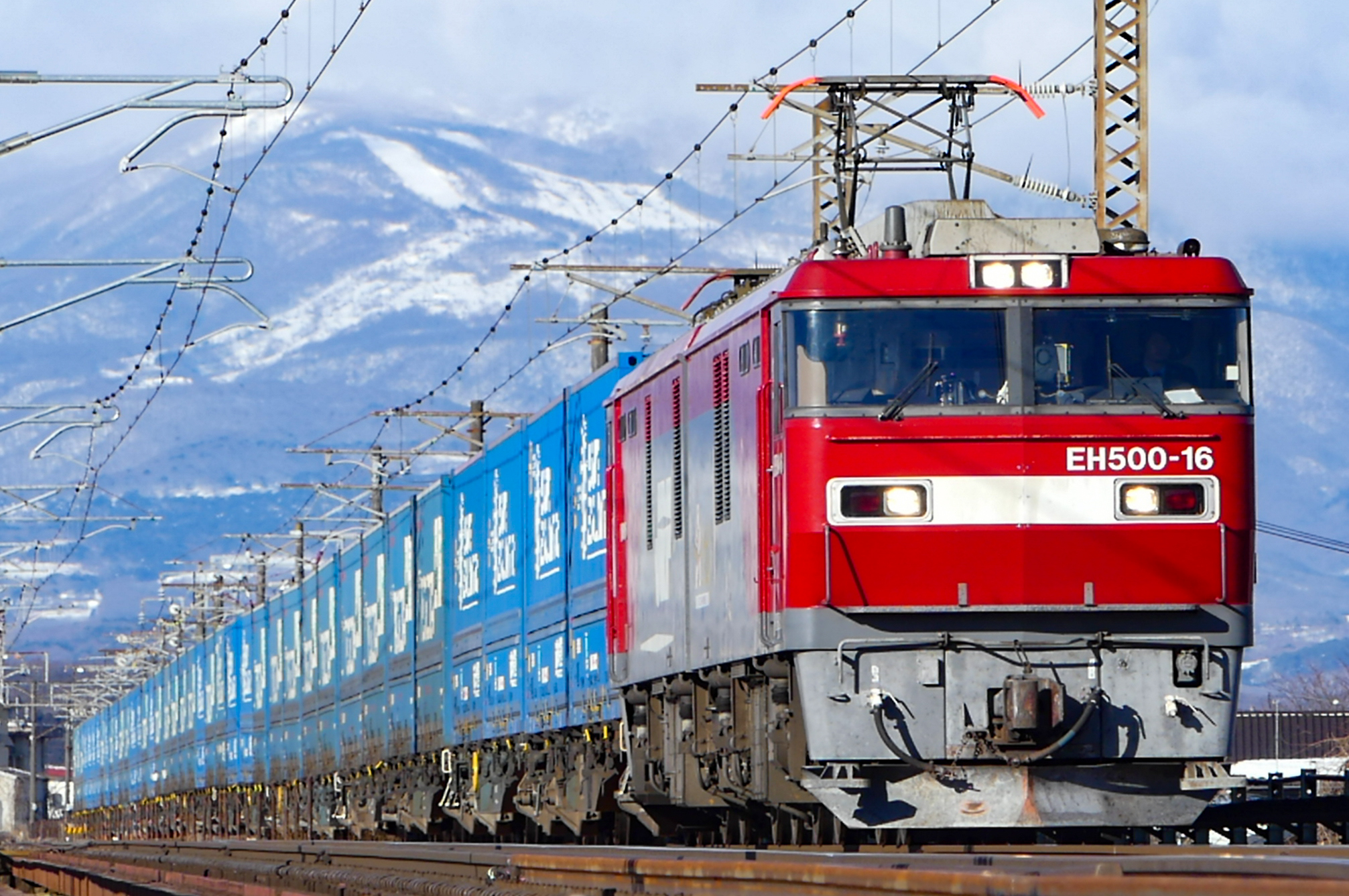
EH500-16 in January 2017

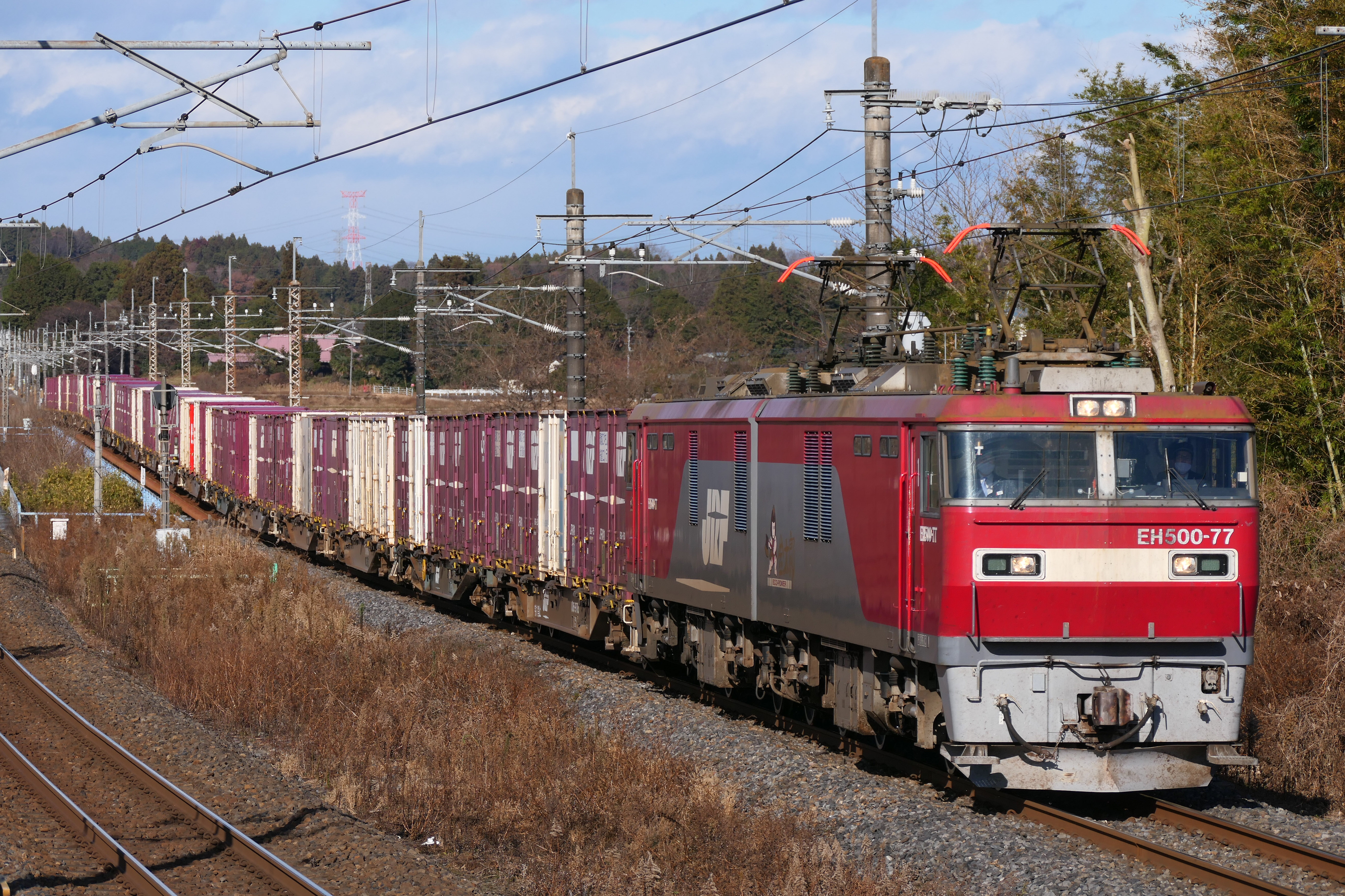
EH500-77 in February 2022

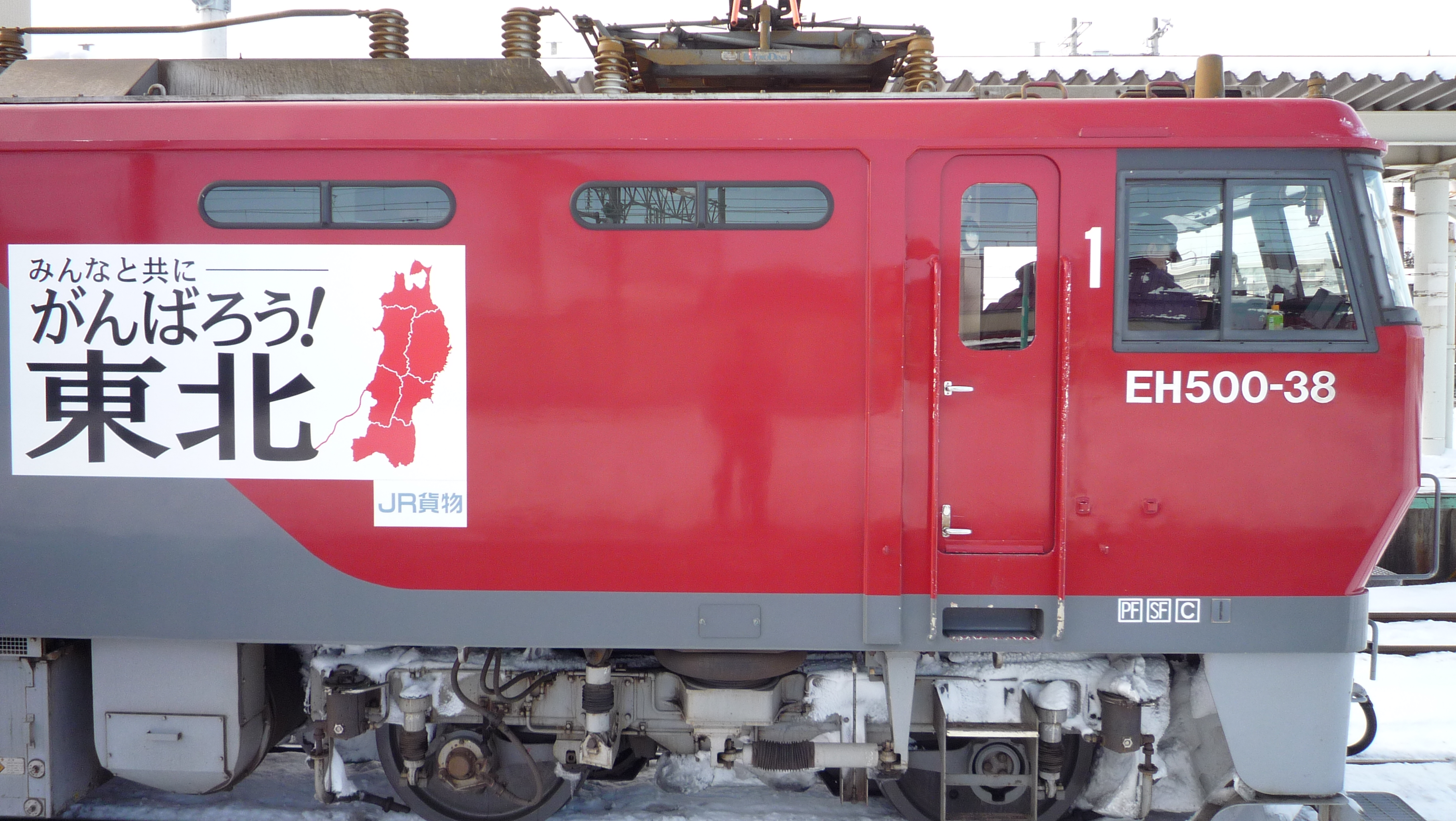
EH500-38 in December 2011 with a "Do your best Tohoku!" sticker added after the 2011 Tohoku earthquake

== Classification ==
The EH500 classification for this locomotive type is explained below. As with previous locomotive designs, the prototype is numbered EH500-901, with subsequent production locomotives numbered from EH500-1 onward.

- E: Electric locomotive
- H: Eight driving axles
- 500: AC/DC locomotive with AC motors

== See also ==
- JNR Class EH10
- JR Freight Class EH200
- JR Freight Class EH800
