= JNR Class EF64 =

Electric locomotive type operated in Japan

Class EF64
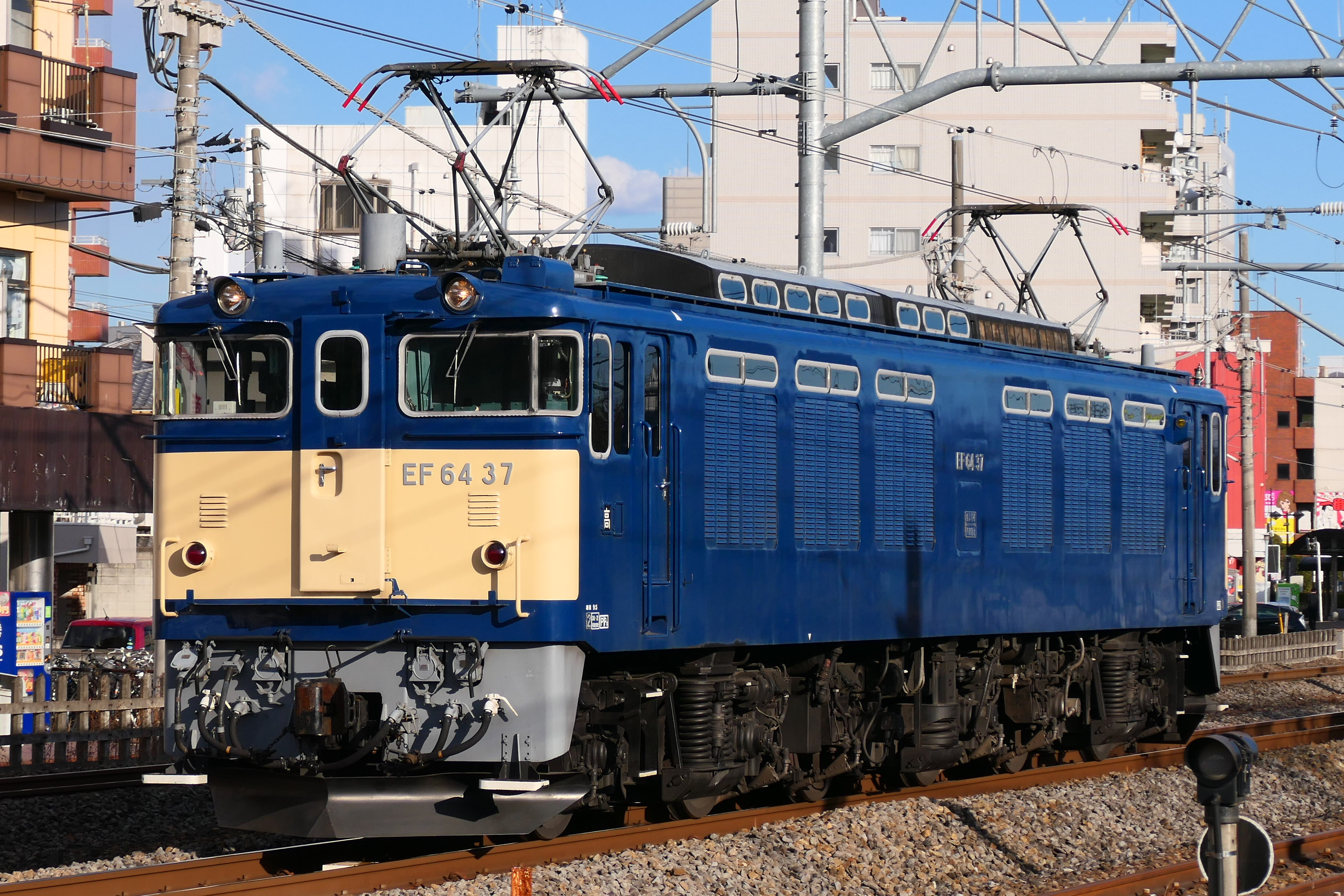
- EF64 37 at Fukaya in February 2021
Type and origin
- Power type: Electric
- Builder: Kawasaki, Toshiba
- Build date: 1964–1982
- Total produced: 132
Specifications
- Configuration
  - UIC: Bo′Bo′Bo′
- Gauge: 1,067 mm (3 ft 6 in)
- Wheel diameter: 1,120 mm (44.09 in)
- Length: EF64-0: 17,900 mm (58 ft 8 3/4 in), EF64-1000: 18,600 mm (61 ft 1/4 in)
- Width: 2,800 mm (9 ft 2 1/4 in)
- Height: 3,960 mm (12 ft 11 7/8 in)
- Loco weight: 96 t (94 long tons; 106 short tons)
- Electric system/s: 1,500 V DC overhead line
- Current pickup: Pantograph
- Traction motors: DC
Performance figures
- Maximum speed: 100 km/h (62 mph)
- Power output: 2.55 MW (3,420 hp)
Career
- Operators: JNR, JR East, JR Central, JR West, JR Freight
- Number in class: 47 (as of 1 April 2016
- Preserved: 2
- Disposition: In service

The Class EF64 (EF64形) is a 6-axle (Bo-Bo-Bo wheel arrangement) DC electric locomotive type operated on passenger and freight services in Japan since 1964.

== Variants ==
- EF64-0: Numbers EF64 1 – 79 (built from 1964 to 1976)
- EF64-1000: Numbers EF64 1001 – 1053 (built from 1980 to 1982)

== History ==
=== EF64-0 subclass ===
The class was designed to replace the ageing EF16 class locomotives used on the steeply-graded Ōu and Chūō mainlines in the early 1960s. Two prototype locomotives, EF64 1 and 2, were delivered in 1964, built by Toshiba and Kawasaki Sharyo respectively. The basic body design was based on that of the earlier Class EF62s but with the more usual Japanese Bo-Bo-Bo wheel arrangement. Livery from the start was all-over blue with just the lower cab ends painted cream.

Full production started in 1965, continuing to 1976 with loco EF64 79. Minor variations within the class included the discontinuation of the cab ventilation grilles above the marker lights from EF64 46 onward. Locos EF64 1 to 12 and EF64 29 to 55 were equipped with train-heating generators for passenger use, and are distinguishable by the train heating indicator lights next to the cab doors. The DT120A/DT121A bogies were virtually identical to those used on the Class EF70.

The first batch of locos, consisting of EF64 1 to 12, were assigned to the Ōu Main Line between Fukushima and Yonezawa, where their duties included assisting KiHa 80 Tsubasa DMUs over the steep gradients.

The second batch, from EF64 13 onward, were allocated to the Chūō Main Line for use primarily on freight duties. With the conversion of the Ōu Main Line from 1,500 V DC to 20 kV AC electrification in October 1968, the first 12 locos were transferred to the Chūō Main Line.

As of 2025, all of them are withdrawn.

=== EF64-1000 subclass ===
The first EF64-1000, EF64 1001, appeared in 1980 for use on the Joetsu Line, replacing ageing Class EF15/16 and EF58 locomotives. This subclass could almost be described as a totally new design. The body was lengthened from 17,900 mm to 18,600, and the bodysides were given an asymmetrical appearance with ventilation grilles at one end and windows at the other. PS22 scissors-type pantographs replaced the PS17 lozenge-type pantographs of the EF64-0s. The bogies were the same DT138A/DT139A type as used on Class EF81 locomotives. A total of 53 EF64-1000s were built by 1982, all by Kawasaki and Toyo Electric. Locos from EF64 1033 onward were built without train-heating generators.

Apart from a handful of locos owned by JR East and based at Takasaki and Nagaoka depots for use on sleeper and charter train haulage, the subclass is largely based at Takasaki for Joetsu Line freight duties. Locos EF64 1046 to 1050, however, are based at Okayama depot for use on Hakubi Line freight duties.

EF64 1030 and 1031, owned by JR East, both have EMU-couplers and jumper sockets, and these locos are frequently used for hauling new rolling stock from the Niitsu factory to Tokyo via the Jōetsu Line, and also for hauling withdrawn rolling stock to Nagano.

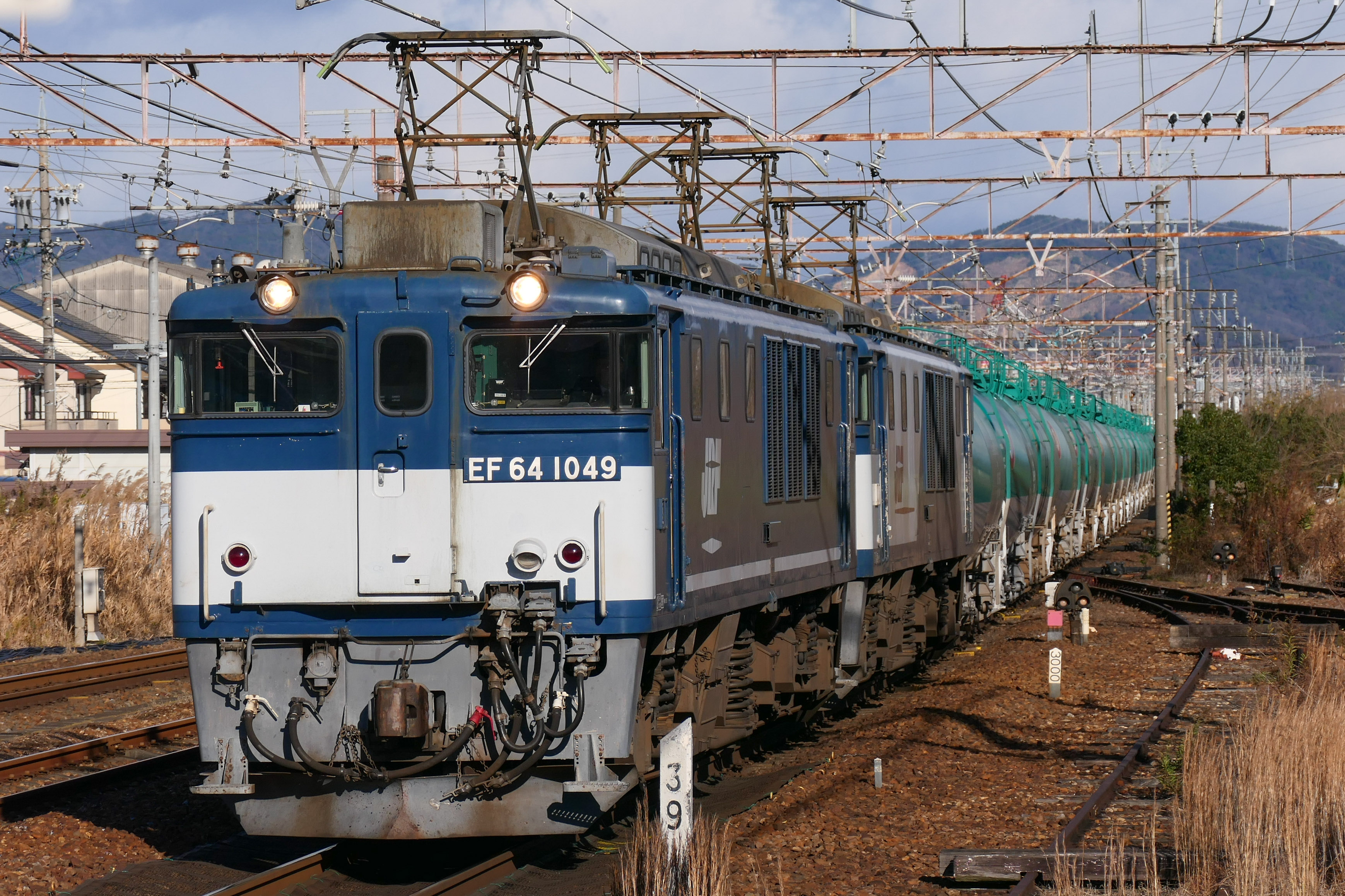
JR Freight EF64 1049 in December 2019

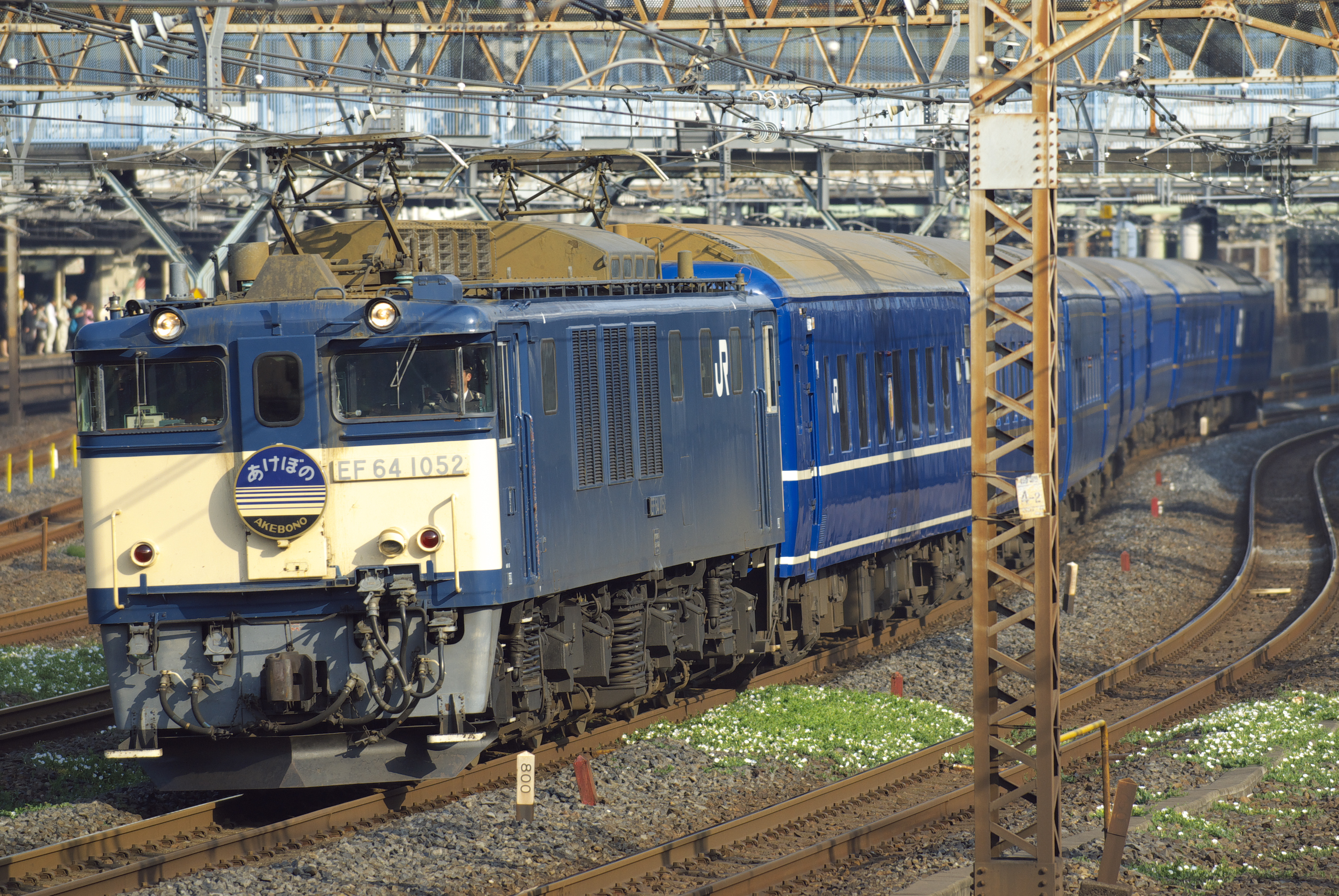
JR East EF64 1052 at the head of an Ueno-bound Akebono sleeping car service in May 2009

=== Life-extension refurbishment ===
From 1996, the EF64-0s underwent a life-extension refurbishment programme, starting with EF64 67. Refurbishment was carried out at Omiya and Hiroshima Works, with locos initially released in the JR Freight livery of two-tone blue and light grey. Minor livery variations were implemented during the programme, and locos treated at Hiroshima were distinguished by having mustard-coloured cab gangway doors.

From 2004 onward, the JR Freight livery was simplified by using a single shade of dark blue and light grey.

The first EF64-1000, EF64 1015, also underwent refurbishment in 2003, appearing in the then-standard JR Freight two-tone blue and light grey livery. However, following complaints from staff about the difficulties in visually distinguishing the loco from refurbished EF65s, a new livery was devised and applied to the next loco to be refurbished, EF64 1009, consisting of standard blue with broad white diagonal bands and large red "JRF" bodyside logos. The first Okayama-based EF64-1000, EF64 1047 was refurbished in July 2006 at Hiroshima Works, and this was released in a further simplified livery of all-over blue with white bodyside stripes and a light grey lower cab front.

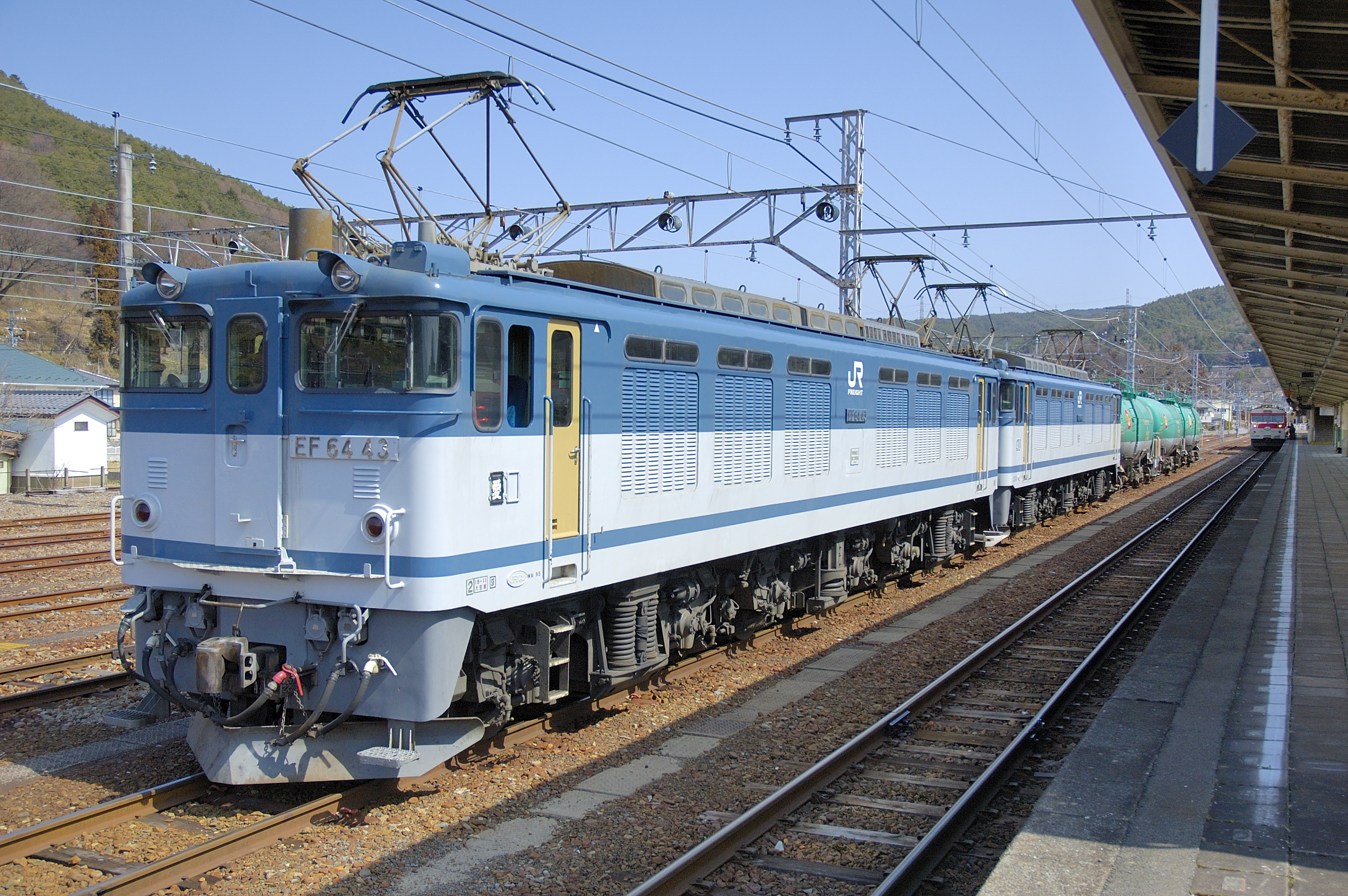
A pair of refurbished EF64-0s at Tatsuno Station in March 2009

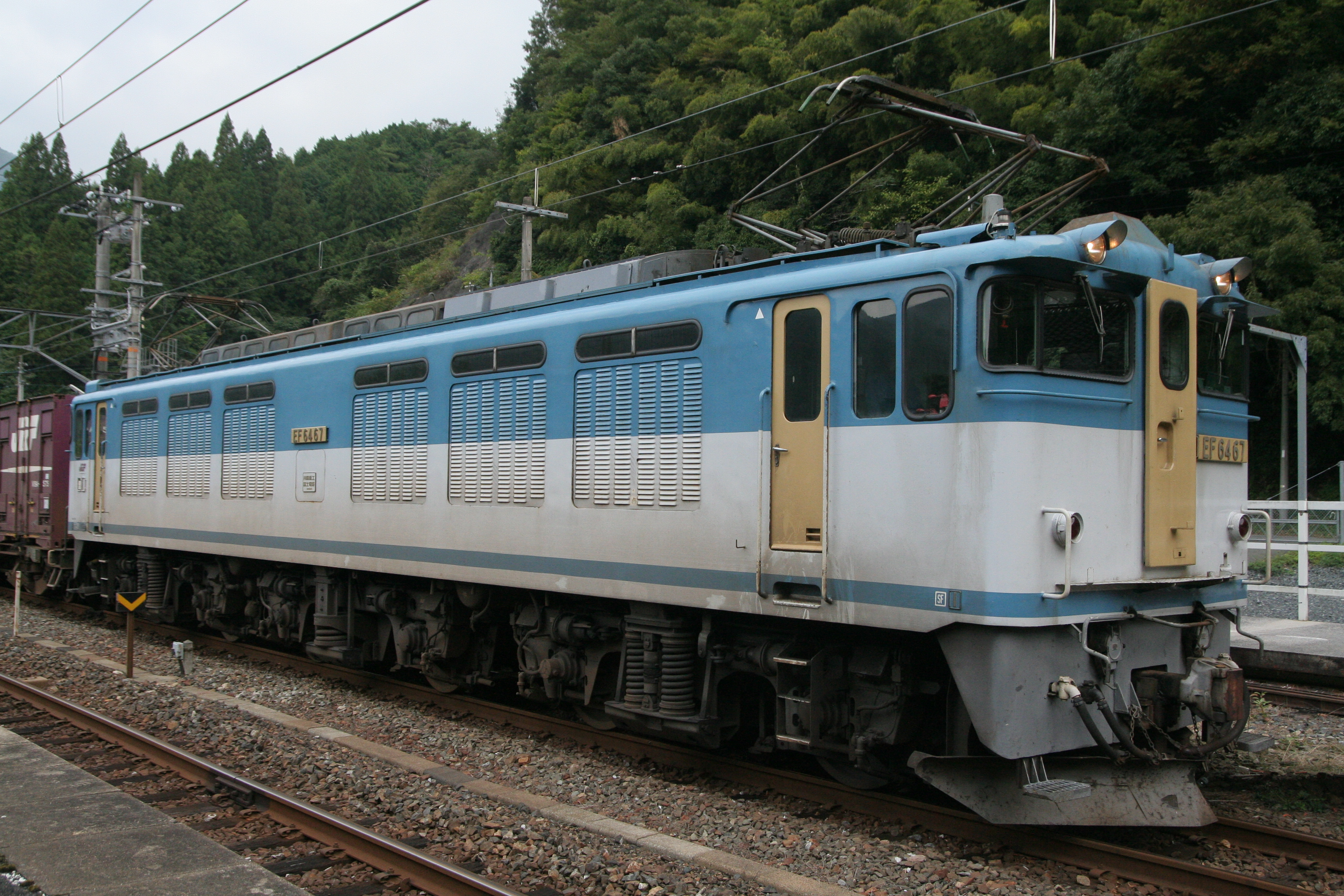
EF64 67 in October 2011 in the livery applied to locomotives refurbished at Hiroshima Works

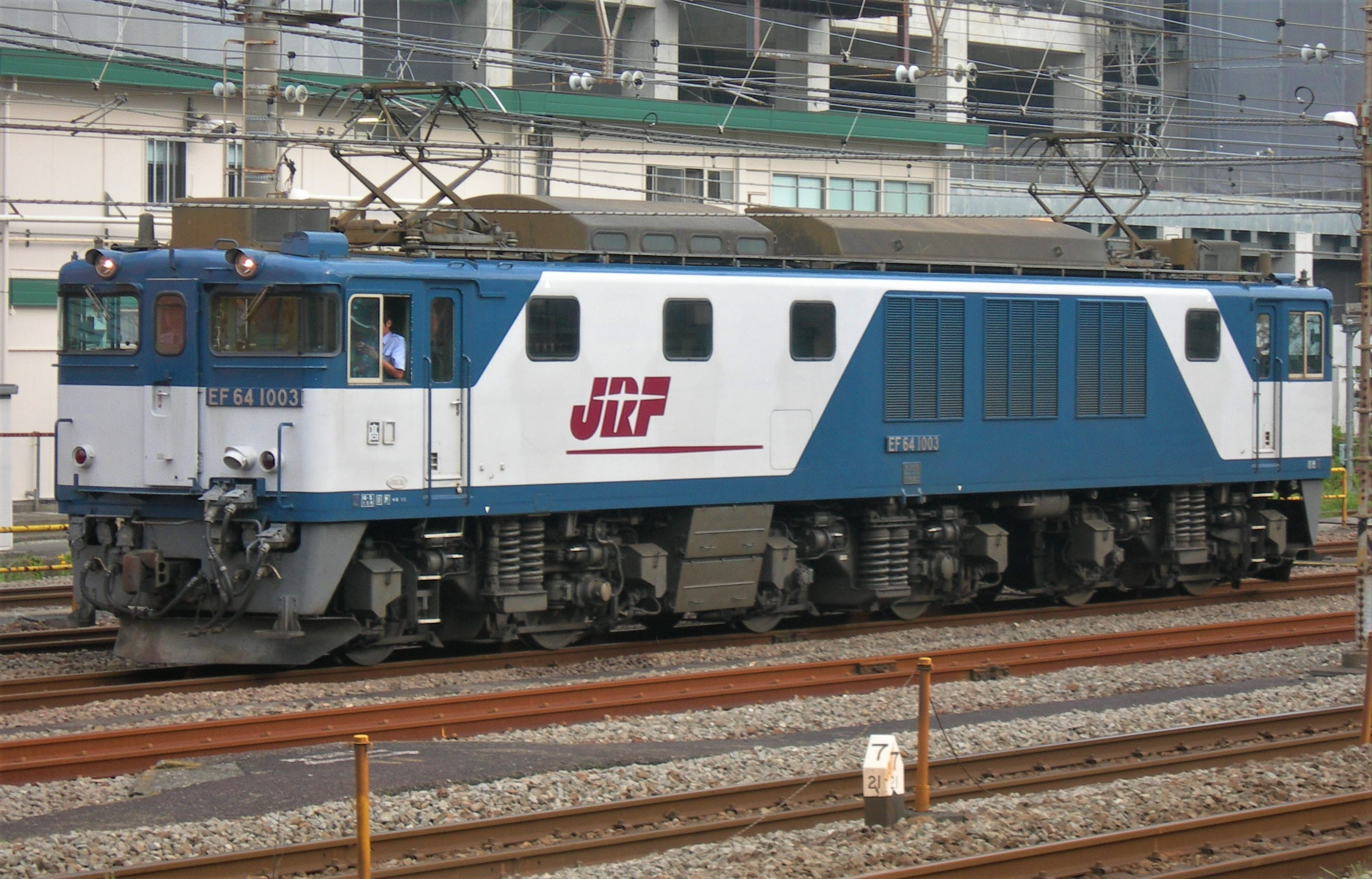
Refurbished EF64 1003 at Negishi in May 2009

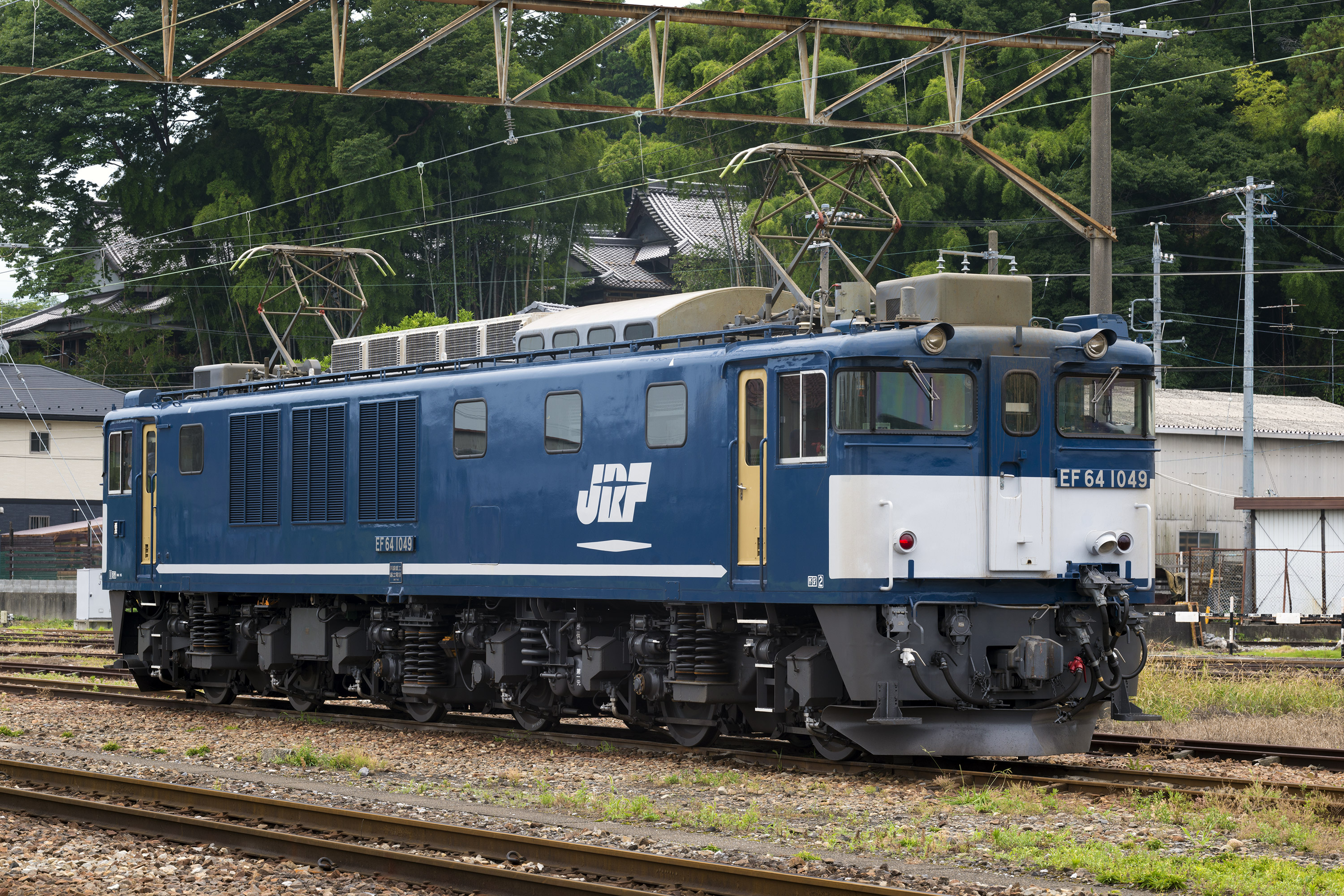
EF64 1049 in revised refurbished livery in July 2013

== Withdrawals ==
There have been no accident-related withdrawals of EF64s, but the first member of the class was withdrawn in 2003 following the introduction of the JR Freight Class EH200. By April 2007, 24 EF64-0s had been withdrawn, and a further 9 were in storage.

As of 1 April 2016, 47 EF64s remained in service, with eight (including the sole remaining Class EF64-0, EF64 37) operated by JR East, and 39 EF64-1000s operated by JR Freight.

== Livery variations ==
- EF64 35 Repainted into white/blue Euroliner livery in August 1990. Although the Euroliner set was withdrawn in April 2005, EF64 35 is allocated to Shizuoka depot (JR Central) and based at Nagoya.
- EF64 37 Painted all-over brown in 2003 to celebrate 100th anniversary of Chūō Main Line between Kofu and Enzan. Allocated to Takasaki depot (JR East), but normally based at Kofu. Used on charter train and engineering train duties.
- EF64 41 Painted all-over brown with gold numbers in May 2006.
- EF64 66 Repainted into white/blue Euroliner livery in August 1985 for use with the 12 series Euroliner Joyful Train set. This was the first EF64 to receive a livery other than standard blue. Operated by JR Central, it was withdrawn in March 2007 and is currently stored at Hamamatsu Works.
- EF64 77 Received a white bodyline stripe and brass depot plates when it hauled the imperial train on the Chūō Mainline in October 1986. Subsequently, it was refurbished and repainted.
- EF64 1001 Painted brown with a white stripe. This locomotive is allocated to Takasaki depot (JR East) for use on charter train duties, but was returned to standard blue JNR livery in October 2017.
- EF64 1010 Painted in blue with large yellow "JR" lettering on the body sides, yellow cab ends, and red numberplates.
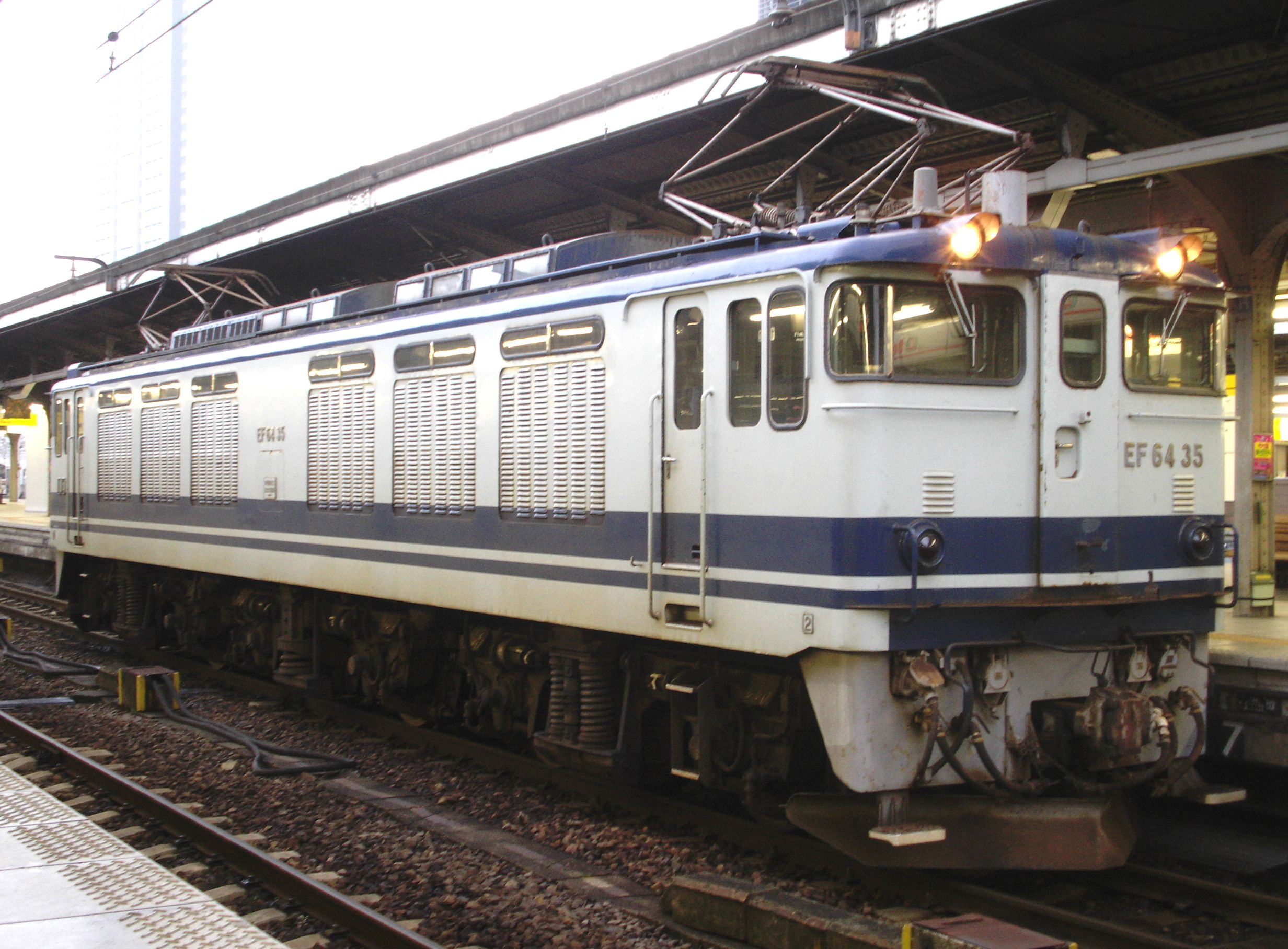
JR Central EF64 35 in Euroliner livery in July 2006

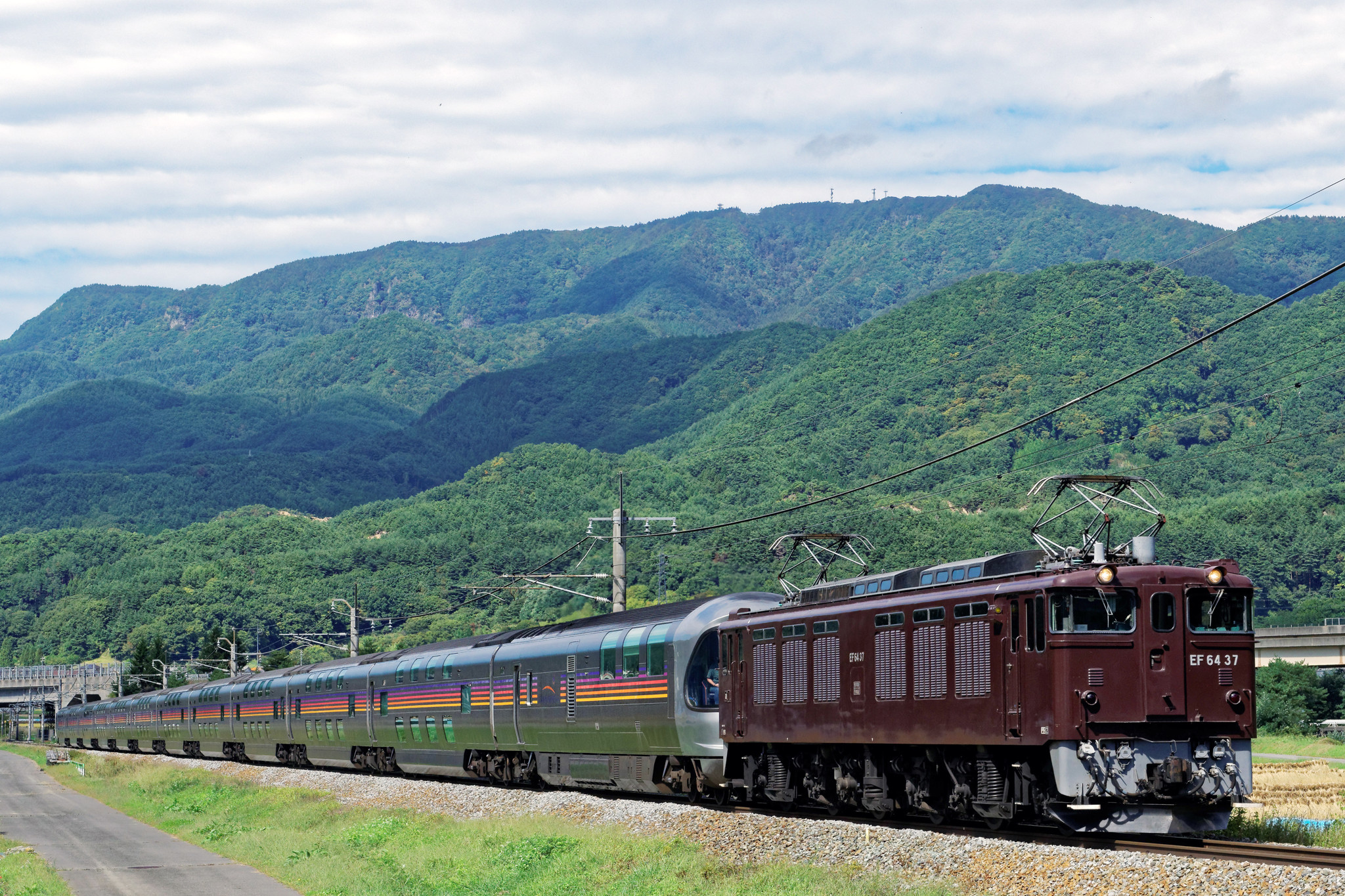
JR East EF64 37 in brown livery in September 2016

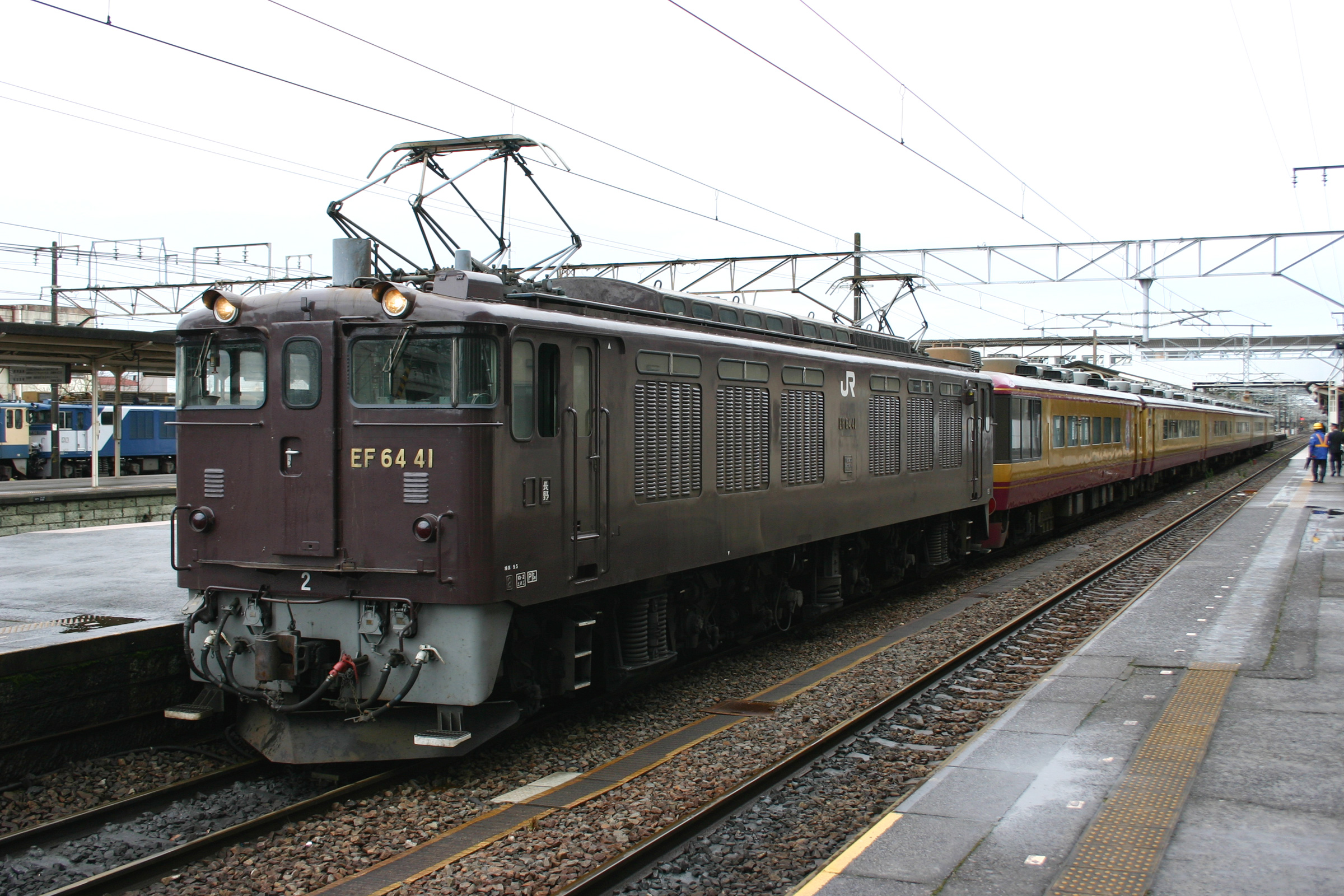
JR East EF64 41 in all-over brown livery with gold numbers in November 2006

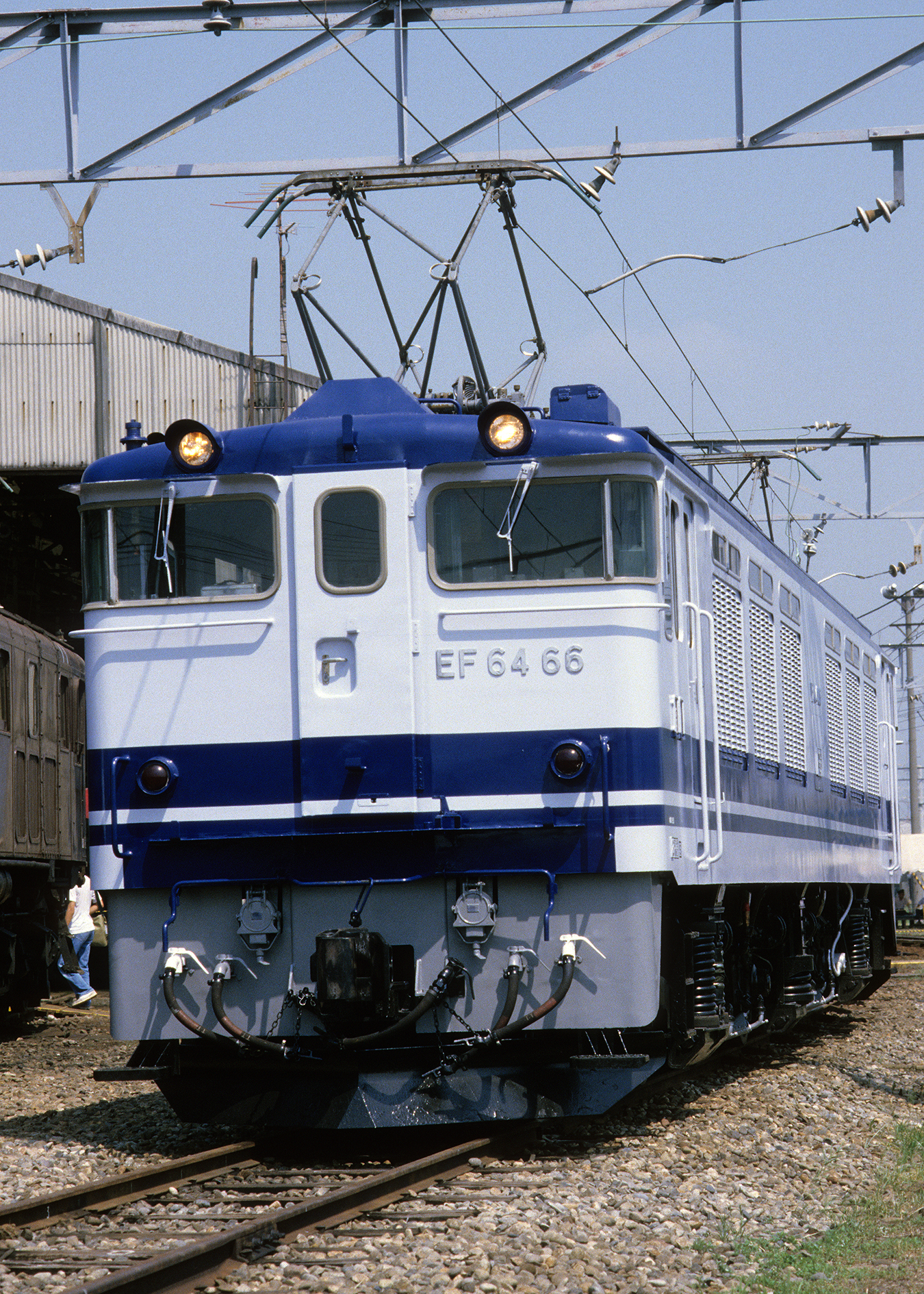
JNR EF64 66 in Euroliner livery in 1985

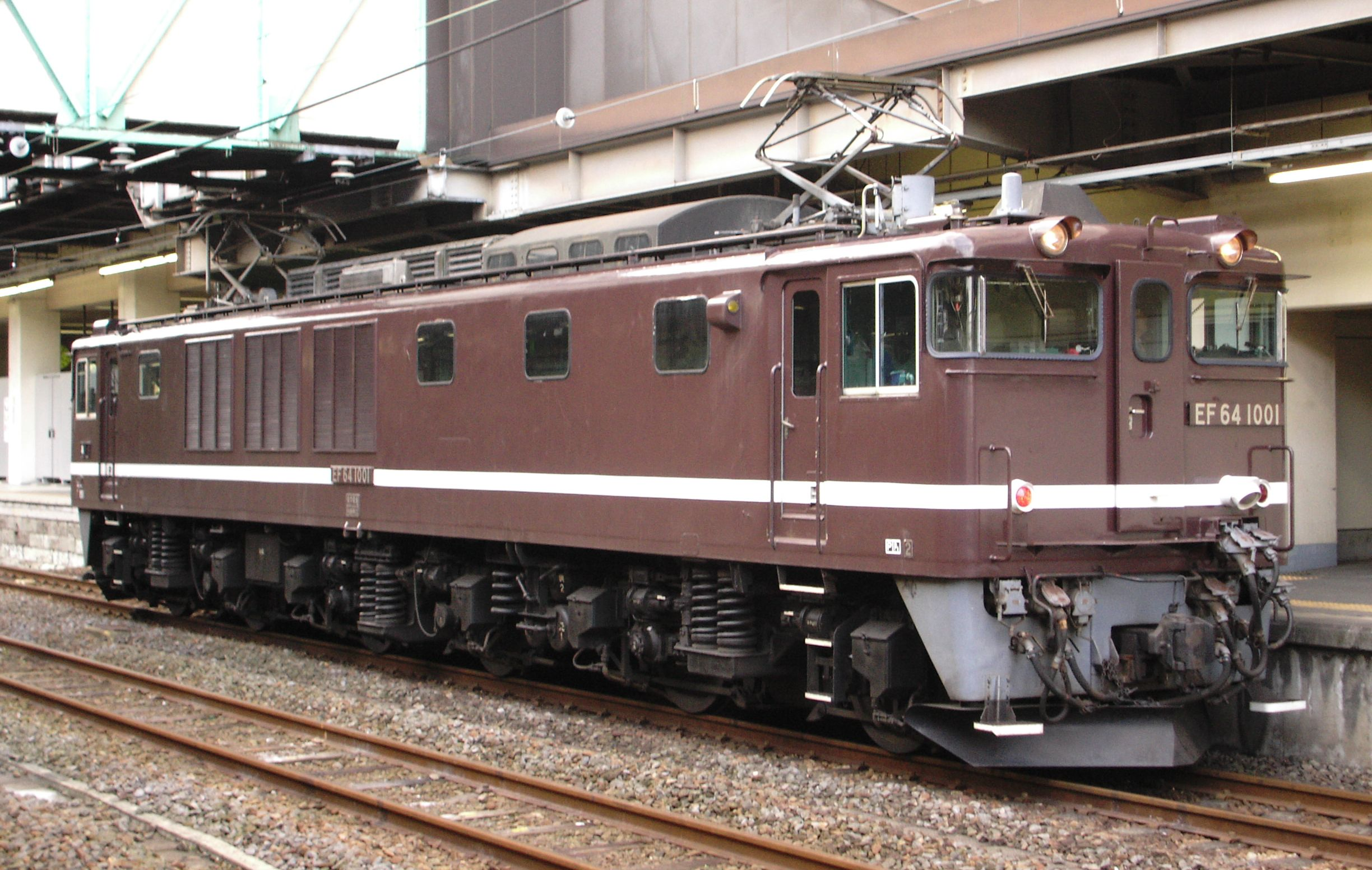
JR East EF64 1001 in brown with white stripe at Takasaki Station in April 2007

== Preserved examples ==
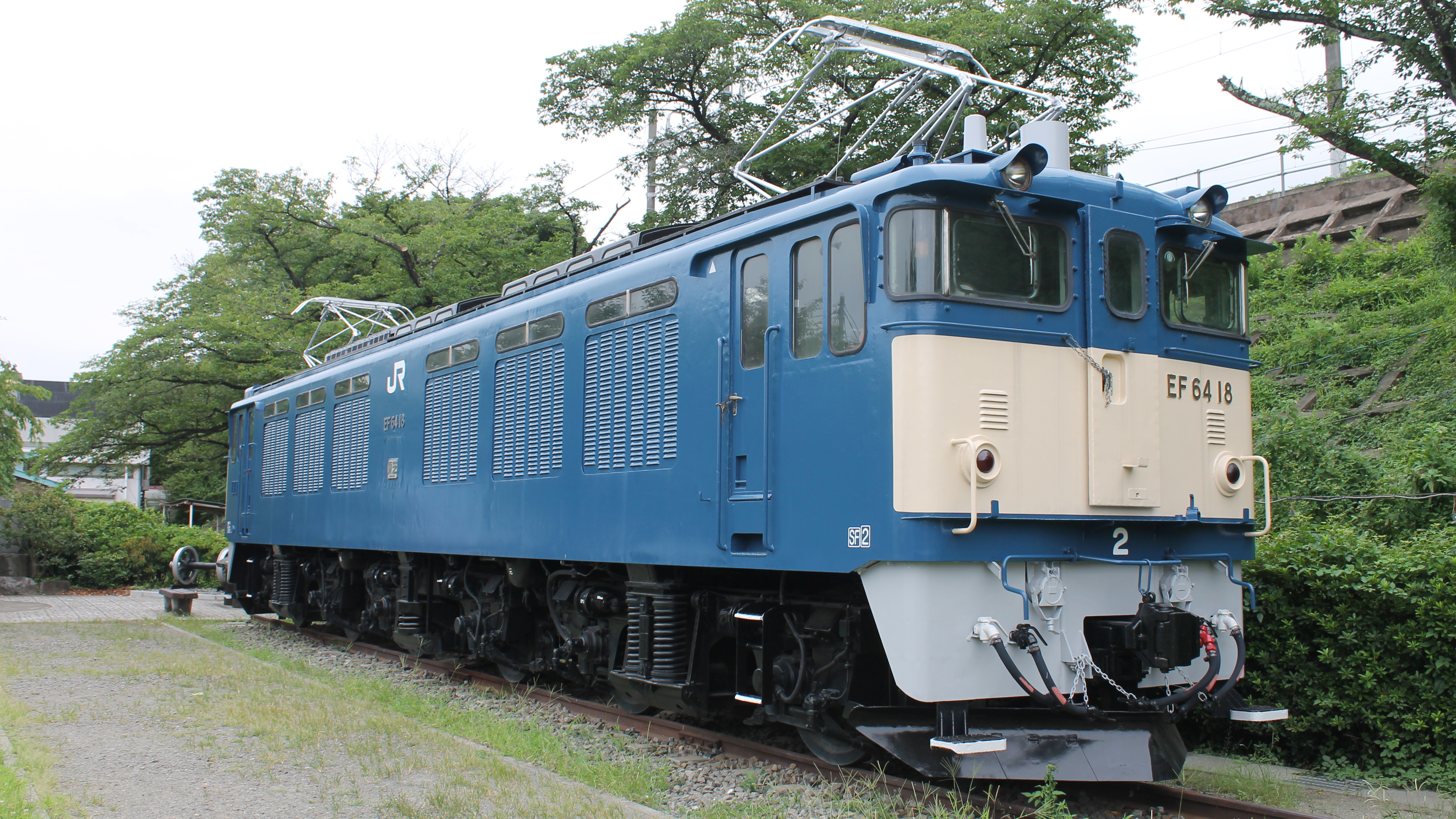
Preserved EF64 18

As of 2014, two Class EF64 locomotives were preserved.

- EF64 18: Preserved in a park close to Katsunuma-budōkyō Station on the Chūō Main Line in Koshu, Yamanashi
- EF64 22: Cab end only privately preserved in Tottori Prefecture
- EF64 77: Stored at Inazawa Depot in Aichi Prefecture for a time and restored to imperial train livery with white stripe in November 2012. But, it was dismantled in January 2020.

== See also ==
- Japan Railways locomotive numbering and classification
