= JR Freight Class DD200 =

Japanese diesel locomotive type

Class DD200
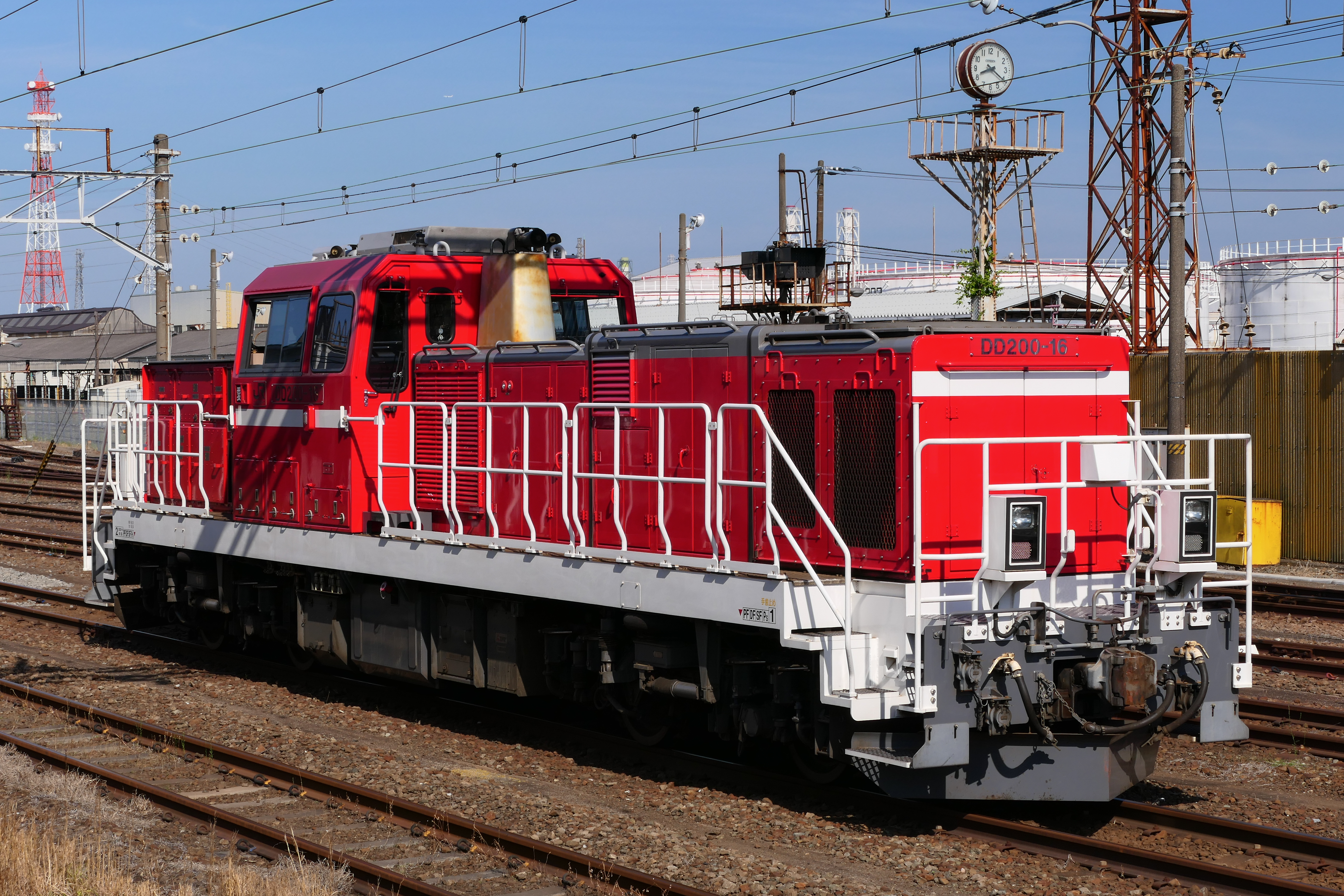
- DD200-16 at Anzen on the Tsurumi Line, 2023
Type and origin
- Power type: Diesel–electric
- Builder: Kawasaki Heavy Industries
- Build date: 2017–
Specifications
- Configuration
  - UIC: Bo-Bo
- Gauge: 1,067 mm (3 ft 6 in)
- Bogies: FDT103 (No. 1 end), FDT103A (No. 2 end)
- Length: 15,900 mm (52 ft 2 in)
- Width: 2,974 mm (9 ft 9.1 in)
- Height: 4,079 mm (13 ft 4.6 in)
- Axle load: 14.7 t (14.5 long tons; 16.2 short tons)
- Loco weight: 58.8 t (57.9 long tons; 64.8 short tons)
- Fuel type: Diesel
- Prime mover: FDML30Z (895 kW (1,200 hp) @ 1,900 rpm)
- Traction motors: 4
- Cylinders: V12
Performance figures
- Maximum speed: 110 km/h (70 mph)
- Power output: 600 kW (800 hp)
- Tractive effort: 20,000 kgf (200,000 N; 44,000 lbf)
Career
- Operators: JR Freight; JR Kyushu; JR Hokkaido; Mizushima Rinkai Railway; Keiyo Rinkai Railway; Kinuura Rinkai Railway
- Number in class: 24 (JR Freight; as of April 2022)
- Numbers: DD200-901 (prototype); DD200-1 onwards (prod. fleet)
- Delivered: June 2017

The Class DD200 (DD200形) is a Bo-Bo wheel arrangement diesel–electric road switcher locomotive type on order by Japan Freight Railway (JR Freight) for use on freight and shunting duties in Japan. A prototype locomotive was delivered in late June 2017 for testing and evaluation in the Tokyo area.

== Overview ==
The Class DD200 was developed to replace ageing Class DE10 and Class DE11 diesel–hydraulic locomotives used on freight services over non-electrified lines, and also for shunting duties at freight terminals. The locomotive has a single water-cooled four-cycle V12-cylinder diesel engine, with a power output of 600 kW (800 hp).

== History ==
Details of the Class DD200 were officially announced by JR Freight on 15 June 2017. A prototype locomotive, DD200-901, was delivered to JR Freight's Shin-Tsurumi Depot from the Kawasaki Heavy Industries factory in Kobe in late June 2017. This is scheduled to undergo testing and evaluation in shunting operations at Tokyo Freight Terminal and in main line operations in the Tokyo area to obtain data to be used in the design of the full-production locomotives.

The first full-production locomotive, DD200-1, was delivered in August 2019. By April 2022, JR Freight had took delivery of 24 locomotives, including the prototype.

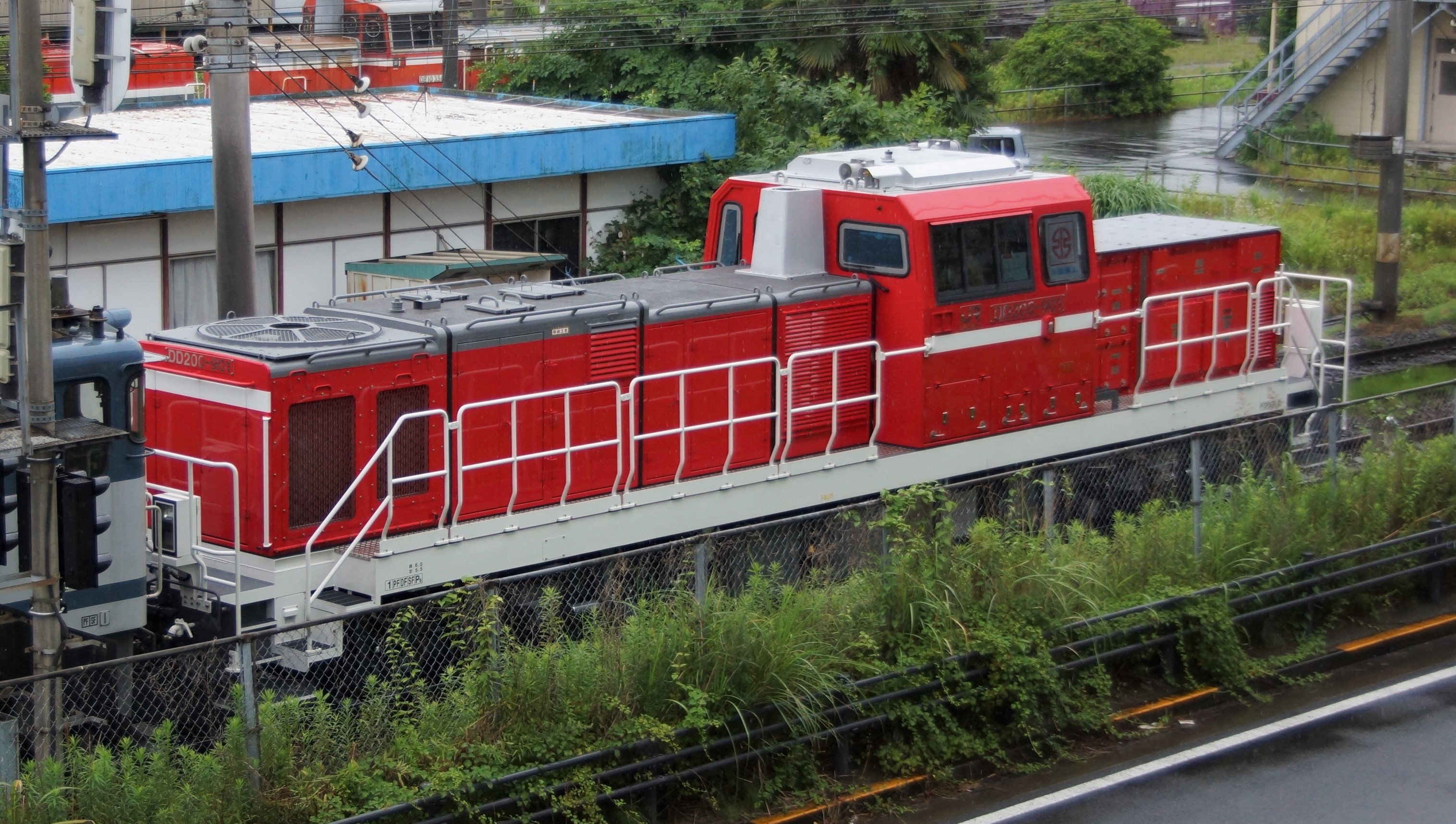
DD200-901 on delivery in June 2017

=== Class DD200-700 ===
In 2021, JR Kyushu introduced its sole example, DD200-701, to be based the Kumamoto Rolling Stock Center. DD200-701 has seen use in the Seven Stars in Kyushu empty stock movements, replacing the DE10s in that role and painted in a matching dark livery as the passenger cars. In 2022, DD200-701's original sealed beam headlights were replaced with LEDs.

=== Class DD200-500 ===
On 27 July 2026, Hokkaido Railway Company (JR Hokkaido) announced that it would introduce three Class DD200-500 locomotives to replace its fleet of Class DE10 locomotives. The first locomotive, DD200-501, was delivered from the Kawasaki Railcar Manufacturing factory three days later.

=== Other operators ===
Outside JR Group, three private operators have purchased the DD200 directly from Kawasaki Heavy Industries. The Mizushima Rinkai Railway took delivery of one example, DD200-601, for use on freight trains to the Okayama Freight Terminal Station via the Sanyo Line, entering service on 2 July 2021. The Keiyo Rinkai Railway purchased one DD200 in June 2021, numbered as DD200-801 and named Red Marine. The Kinuura Rinkai Railway had sought to replace its aging KE65 locomotives, and on 19 November 2024, the company took delivery of KD58-1, identical to the DD200 but with a different classification, entering service on 15 March 2025.

== Classification ==
The DD200 classification for this locomotive type is explained below.

- D: Diesel locomotive
- D: Four driving axles
- 200: Diesel–electric locomotive with AC motors
