= Cassiopeia (train) =

Luxury overnight limited express train service in Japan

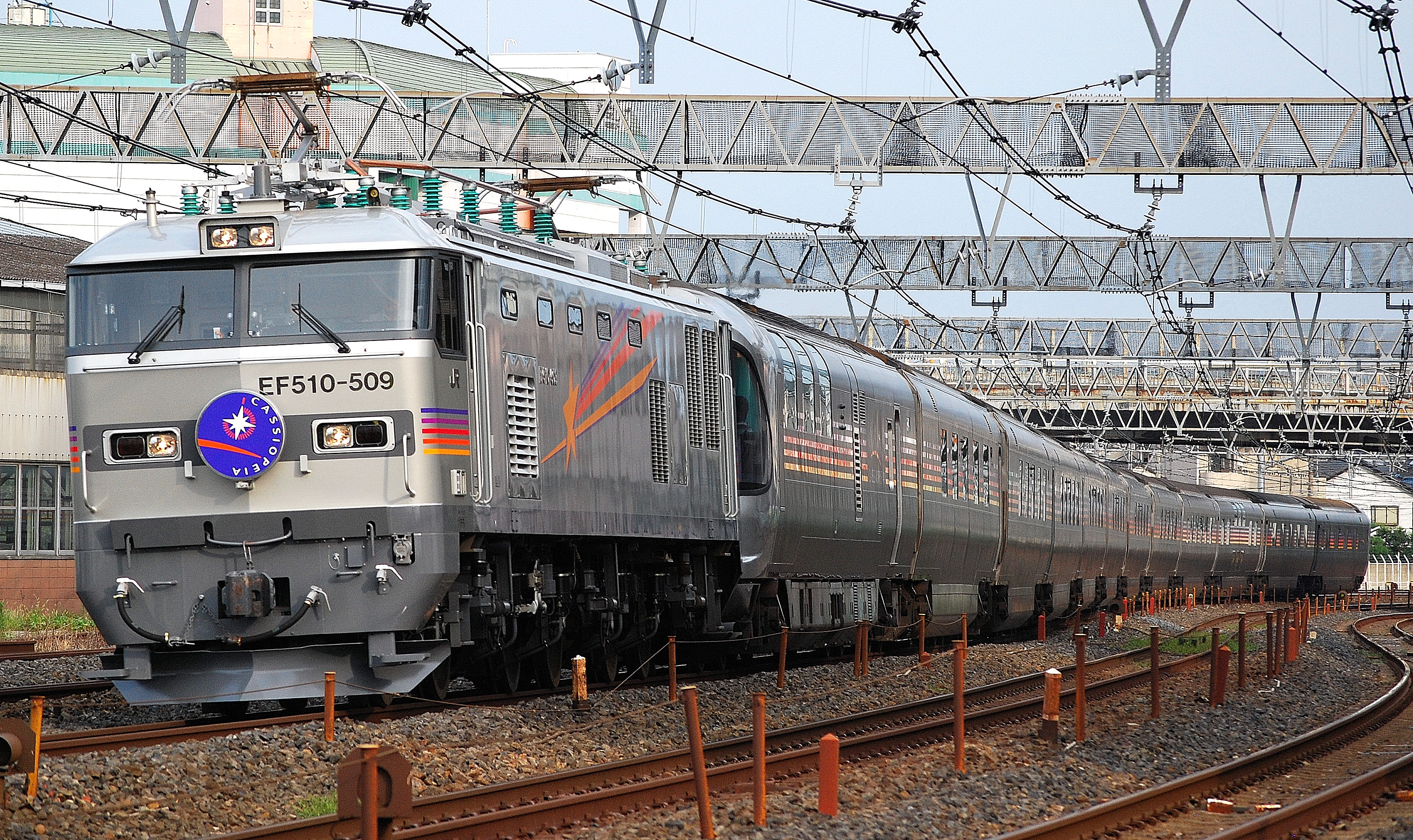
- A Cassiopeia service hauled by EF510-509 in August 2010

Overview
- Service type: Limited express
- Status: Ceased
- Locale: Japan
- First service: July 1999 (scheduled service); July 2012 (cruise service)
- Last service: March 2016 (scheduled service); June 2025 (cruise service)
- Former operator: JR East

Route
- Termini: Ueno; Sapporo (scheduled service) Sendai (cruise service) Aomori (cruise service)
- Average journey time: Approx. 16½ hours (scheduled service)
- Service frequency: 3 times weekly (Ueno-Sapporo)

On-board services
- Seating arrangements: Lounge car
- Sleeping arrangements: Compartments and suites
- Catering facilities: Dining car
- Observation facilities: Observation lounge at end of train

Technical
- Rolling stock: E26 series sleeping cars
- Track gauge: 1,067 mm (3 ft 6 in)
- Electrification: 1,500 V DC / 20 kV AC (50 Hz)
- Operating speed: 110 km/h (70 mph)

The Cassiopeia (カシオペア, Kashiopea) was a luxury cruise train service in Japan, operated by East Japan Railway Company (JR East). It formerly operated as a limited express from July 1999 until March 2016, when scheduled service was discontinued due to the opening of the Hokkaido Shinkansen. It ran between Ueno Station in Tokyo and the city of Sapporo in the northern island of Hokkaido. The one-way journey to Sapporo took approximately 16 1/2 hours. Cruise service was discontinued in June 2025.

== Route ==
The original Cassiopeia ran on the following rail lines:

JR East

- Tōhoku Main Line, Ueno – Morioka

IGR Iwate Ginga Railway

- Iwate Galaxy Railway Line, Morioka – Metoki

Aoimori Railway

- Aoimori Railway Line, Metoki – Aomori

JR East

- Tsugaru Line, Aomori – Naka-Oguni

JR Hokkaido

- Kaikyō Line, Naka-Oguni – Kikonai
- Esashi Line, Kikonai – Goryōkaku
- Hakodate Main Line, Goryōkaku – Hakodate – Oshamambe
- Muroran Main Line, Oshamambe – Numanohata
- Chitose Line, Numanohata – Shiroishi
- Hakodate Main Line, Shiroishi – Sapporo

The train changed direction at Aomori and Hakodate.

Northbound trains to Sapporo departed from Ueno after 16:00, and called at Ōmiya, Utsunomiya, Kōriyama, Fukushima, Sendai, Ichinoseki, and Morioka. The first stop in Hokkaido was at Hakodate at 05:00 the following day, with arrival in Sapporo around 09:30. Southbound trains to Ueno departed from Sapporo after 16:00; the first stop after leaving Hokkaido was at Sendai, around 04:30 the following day, and the arrival time at Ueno Station around 09:30.

The original Cassiopeia departed three times per week, with more departures during holiday periods.

== Rolling stock ==
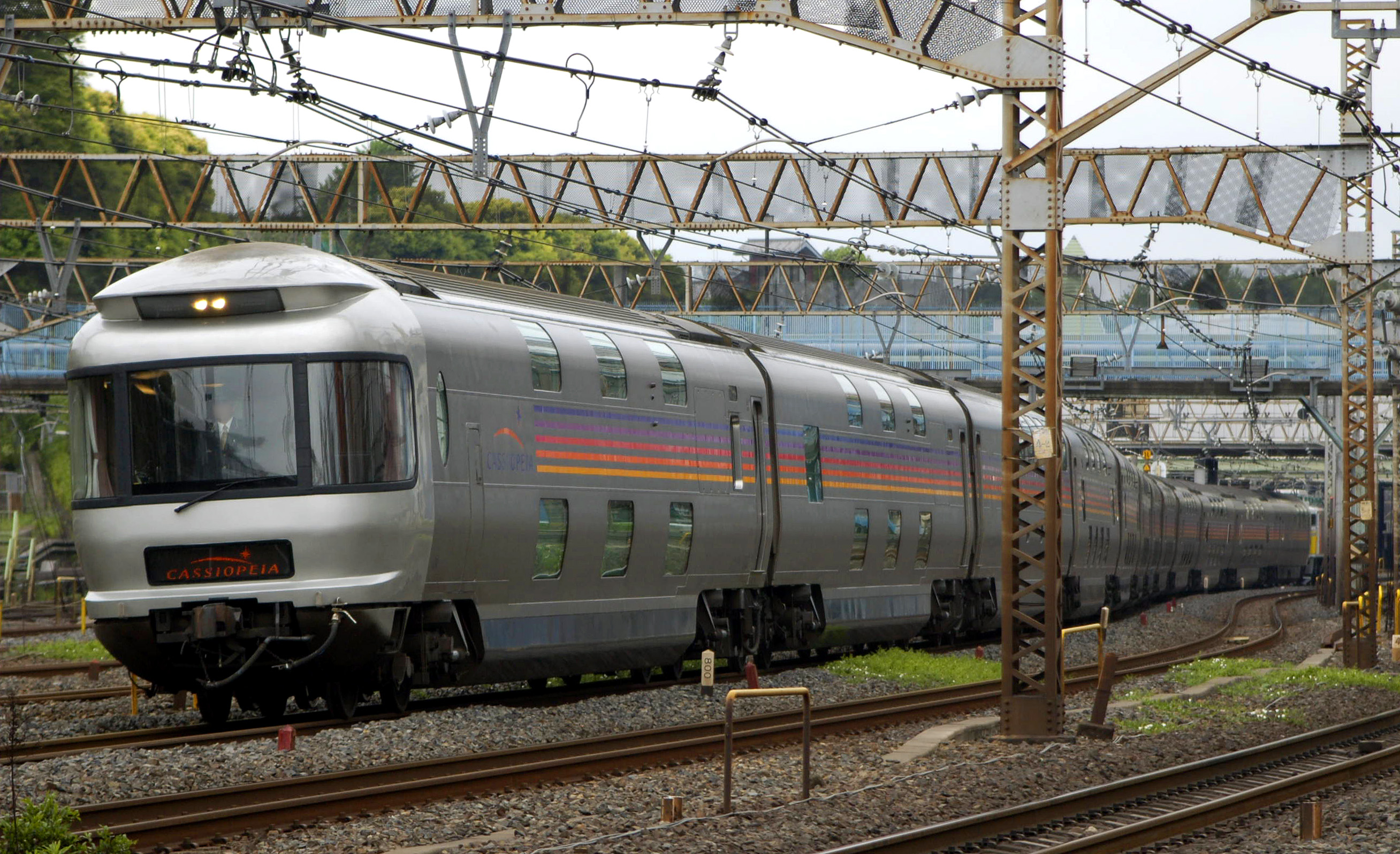
Deluxe suite car at rear of Cassiopeia train (actually being propelled empty into Ueno Station)

The train is formed of twelve E26 series sleeping cars, including a lounge car at the Sapporo end and a deluxe suite at the Ueno end. The locomotive power for charter services is provided by JR Freight, which include Class EF81 dual-voltage locomotives or Class EF64 locomotives from Ueno to Aomori, Class EH800 AC electric locomotives for the Seikan Tunnel and Class DF200 diesel locomotives for non-electrified routes in Hokkaido.

=== Former rolling stock ===
The original train was hauled by a JR East Tabata-based Class EF510-500 dual-voltage electric locomotive between Ueno and Aomori, by a JR Hokkaido ED79 AC electric locomotive between Aomori and Hakodate, and by a pair of JR Hokkaido DD51 diesel locomotives between Hakodate and Sapporo. Prior to June 2010, the services were hauled by JR East Class EF81 dual-voltage electric locomotives.

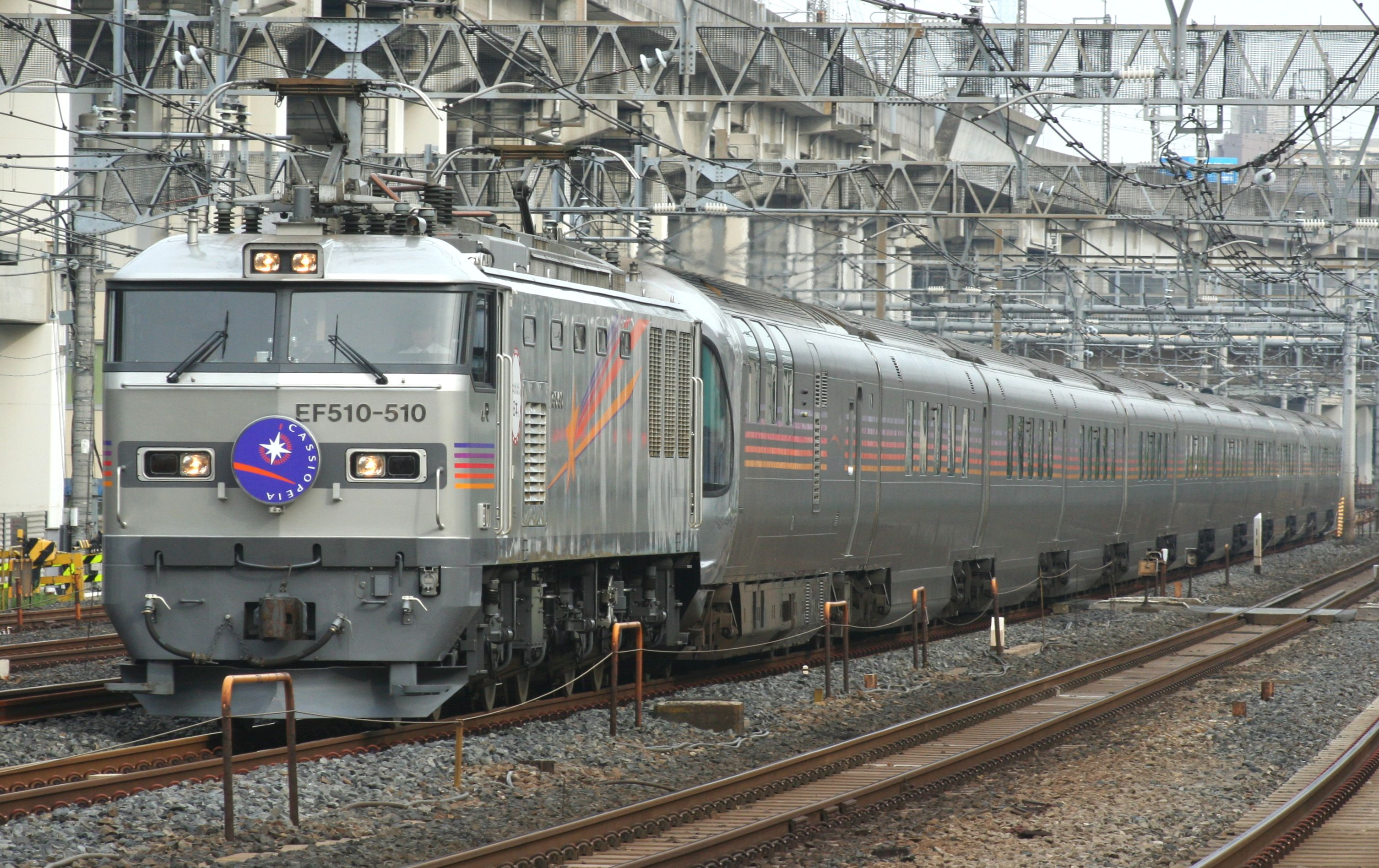
A Cassiopeia service in April 2012, hauled by JR East Class EF510-500 electric locomotive EF510-510

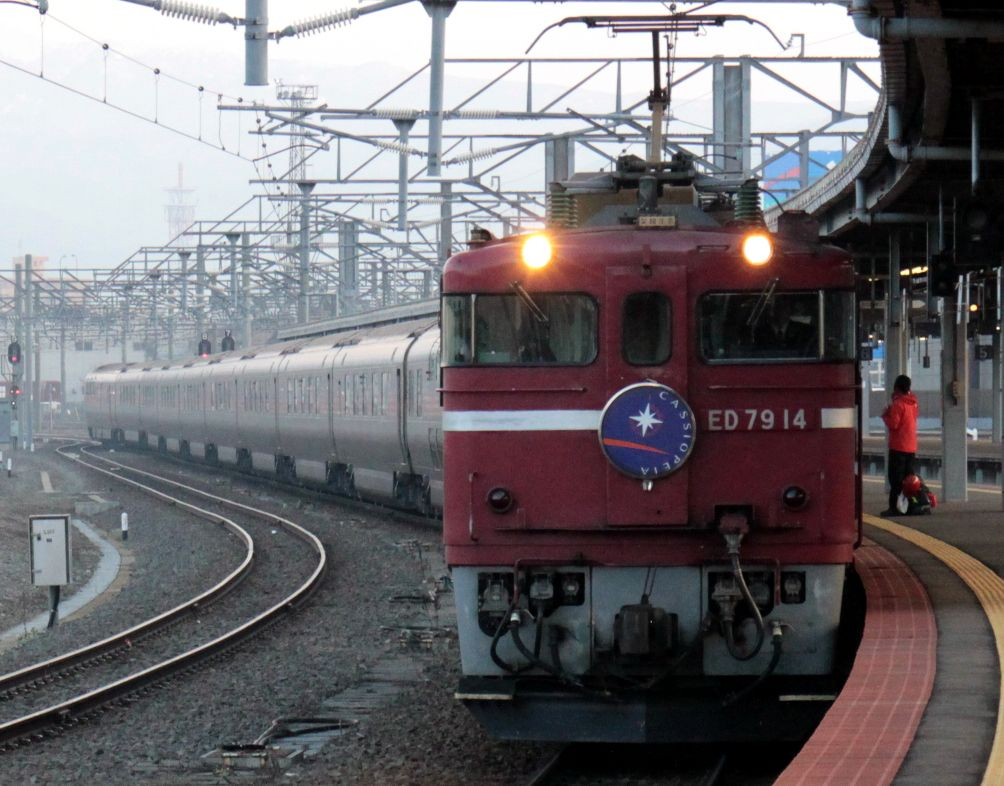
A Cassiopeia service at Hakodate Station in March 2016, hauled by JR Hokkaido Class ED79 electric locomotive ED79 14

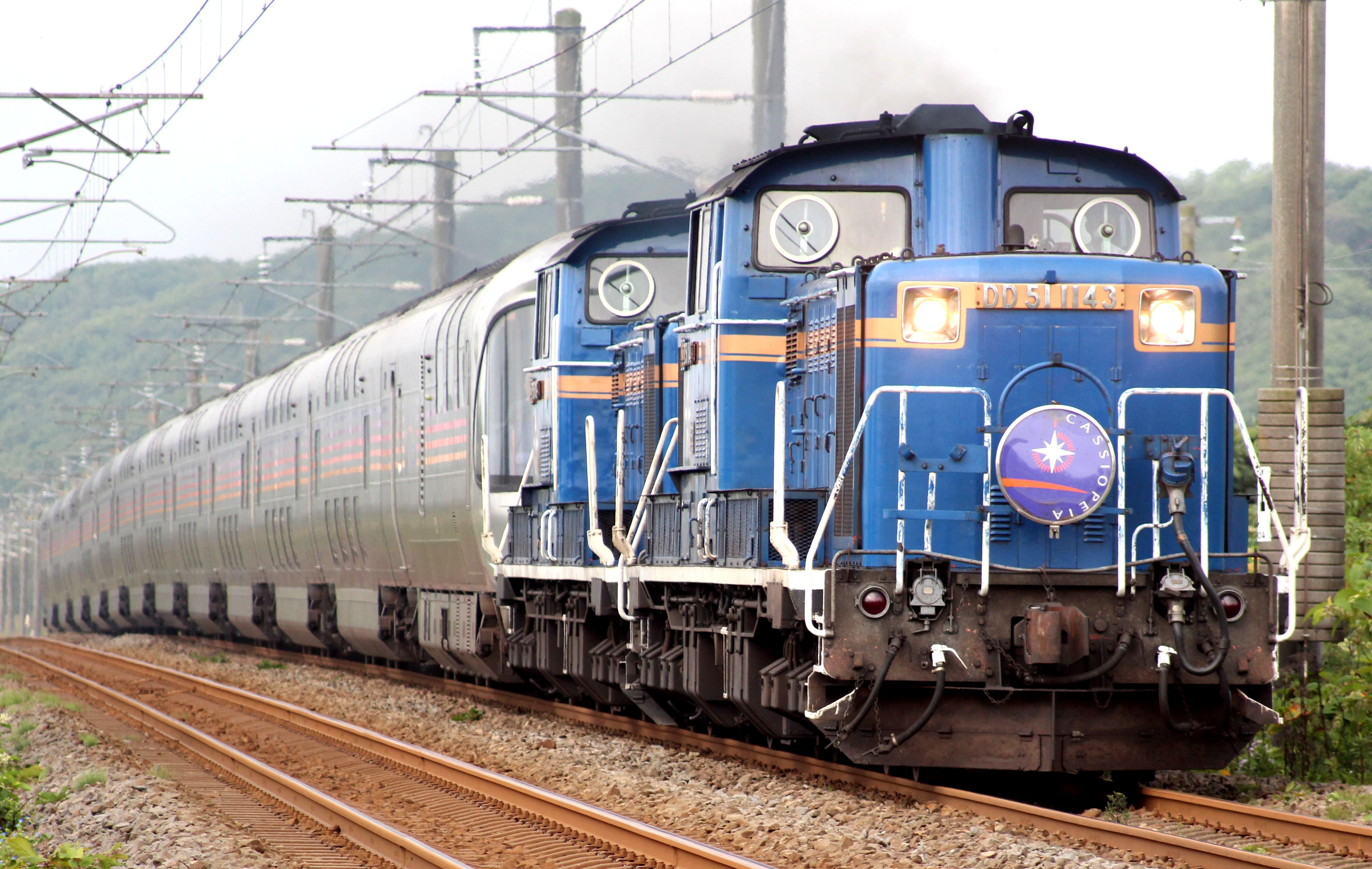
A Cassiopeia service in Hokkaido in September 2011, hauled by a pair of JR Hokkaido Class DD51 diesel locomotives

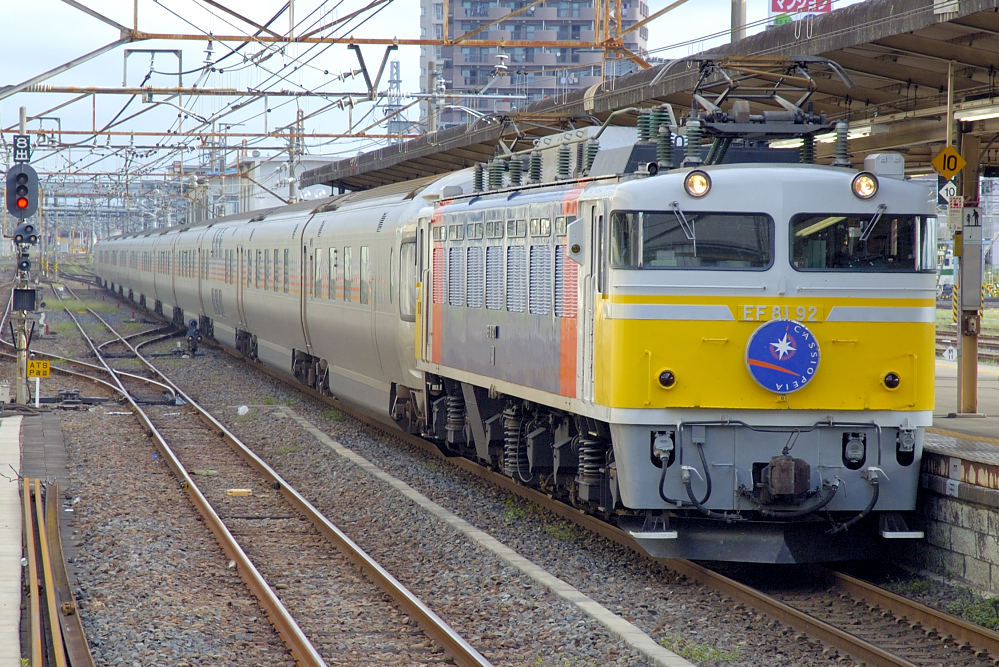
A Cassiopeia service at Utsunomiya Station in September 2007, hauled by a JR East Class EF81 electric locomotive

=== Formation ===
1	2	3	4	5	6	7	8	9	10	11	12
SuRoNeFu E26	SuRoNe E26	MaShi E26	SuRoNe E27	SuRoNe E27	SuRoNe E27	SuRoNe E27	SuRoNe E27	SuRoNe E27	SuRoNe E27	SuRoNe E27	KaHaFu E26
Cassiopeia Suite	Cassiopeia Suite / Cassiopeia Deluxe	Dining car	Cassiopeia Twin	Cassiopeia Twin / Mini lobby	Cassiopeia Twin / Shower room	Cassiopeia Twin	Cassiopeia Twin	Cassiopeia Twin / Mini lobby	Cassiopeia Twin / Shower room	Cassiopeia Twin	Lounge Car/ Generator

== Accommodation and fares ==
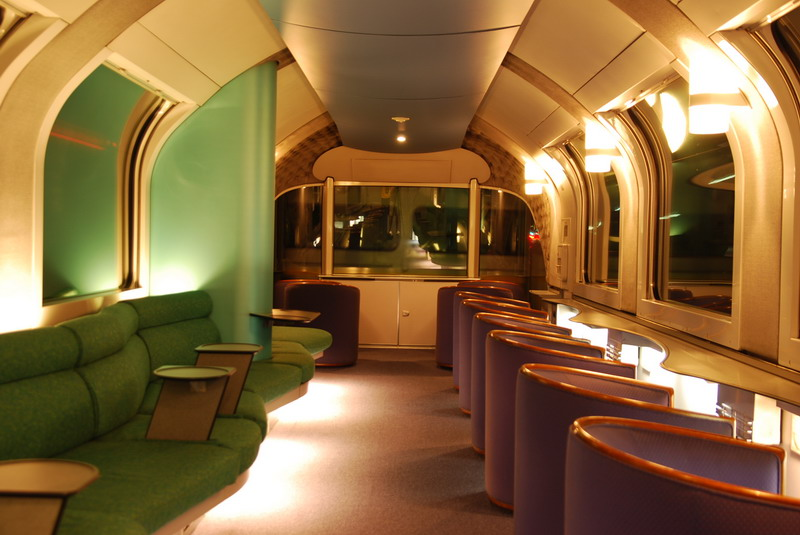
Interior of the lounge car looking towards the locomotive

The Cassiopeia consists of all type "A" accommodation, all specific to this particular train. A flat fee is charged for all rooms, regardless of starting or ending location. Accommodation rates range from about ¥27,000 for a Cassiopeia Twin room to ¥51,000 for a Cassiopeia Suite.

The other fares, the basic fare and limited express fare, are based on distance. For tourists using the Japan Rail Pass during the original service, the basic fare did not have to be paid. However, there is a charge of about ¥5,500 each way for travelling on a section of railroad not owned by Japan Railways between Morioka and Aomori.

== History ==
The Cassiopeia service from Ueno to Sapporo first ran on 16 July 1999.

From the start of the revised timetable on 17 March 2012, smoking was banned in the restaurant car of Cassiopeia services.

=== End of scheduled services ===
The last scheduled Cassiopeia services were discontinued in March 2016 ahead of the opening of the Hokkaido Shinkansen high-speed line. The last down service departed from Ueno Station in Tokyo on 19 March 2016, and the last up service departed from Sapporo on 20 March, arriving at Ueno on 21 March.

== Cruise services (as Cassiopeia Cruise and Cassiopeia Travelogue) ==
The first Cassiopeia Cruise service operated from Ueno via Niigata to Aomori then back via Sendai, taking place between October 12 and 14, 2012, as celebration of 140 years of rail in Japan. Between October 5 and 8, 2013, the Cassiopeia Cruise Akita operated as a part of the Akita Destination Campaign. After the Hokkaido Shinkansen opened through the Seikan Tunnel, the Cassiopeia Cruise was replaced by the Cassiopeia Travelogue.

Neither JR East nor JR Hokkaido owns electric locomotives capable of operating through the Seikan Tunnel to and from Hokkaido after the overhead line voltage was raised from 20 kV to 25 kV AC with the opening of the Hokkaido Shinkansen on 26 March 2016, but JR East leases JR Freight Class EH800 electric locomotives to haul the Cassiopeia trainset on seasonal services through the Seikan Tunnel after the Hokkaido Shinkansen opened. The coaches are also used on cruise train services to other destinations within the JR East region, which include Sendai and Aomori. Cruise services were discontinued by the end of June 2025.

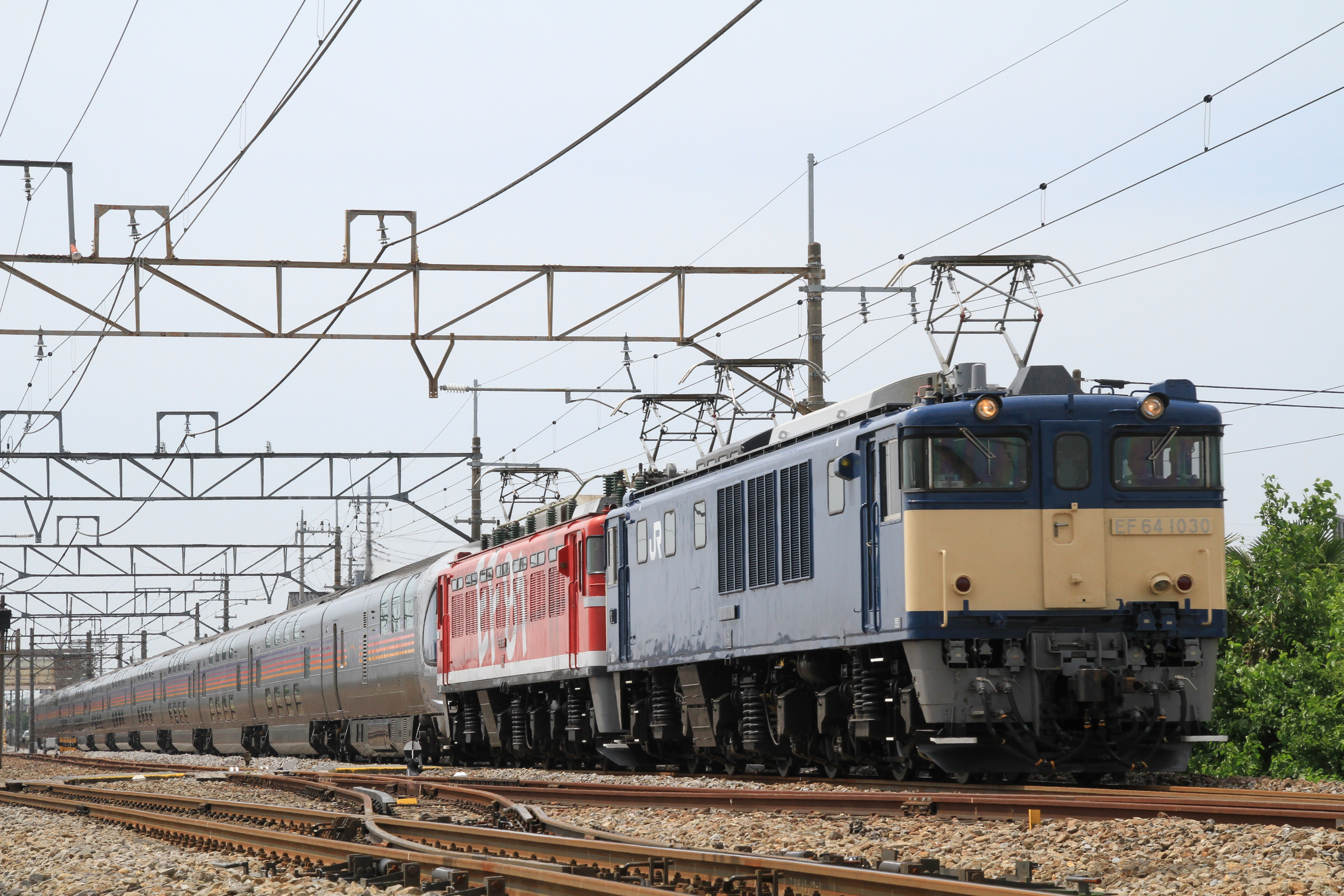
A Cassiopeia cruise train hauled by JR East Class EF64-1000 and EF81 electric locomotives in June 2016

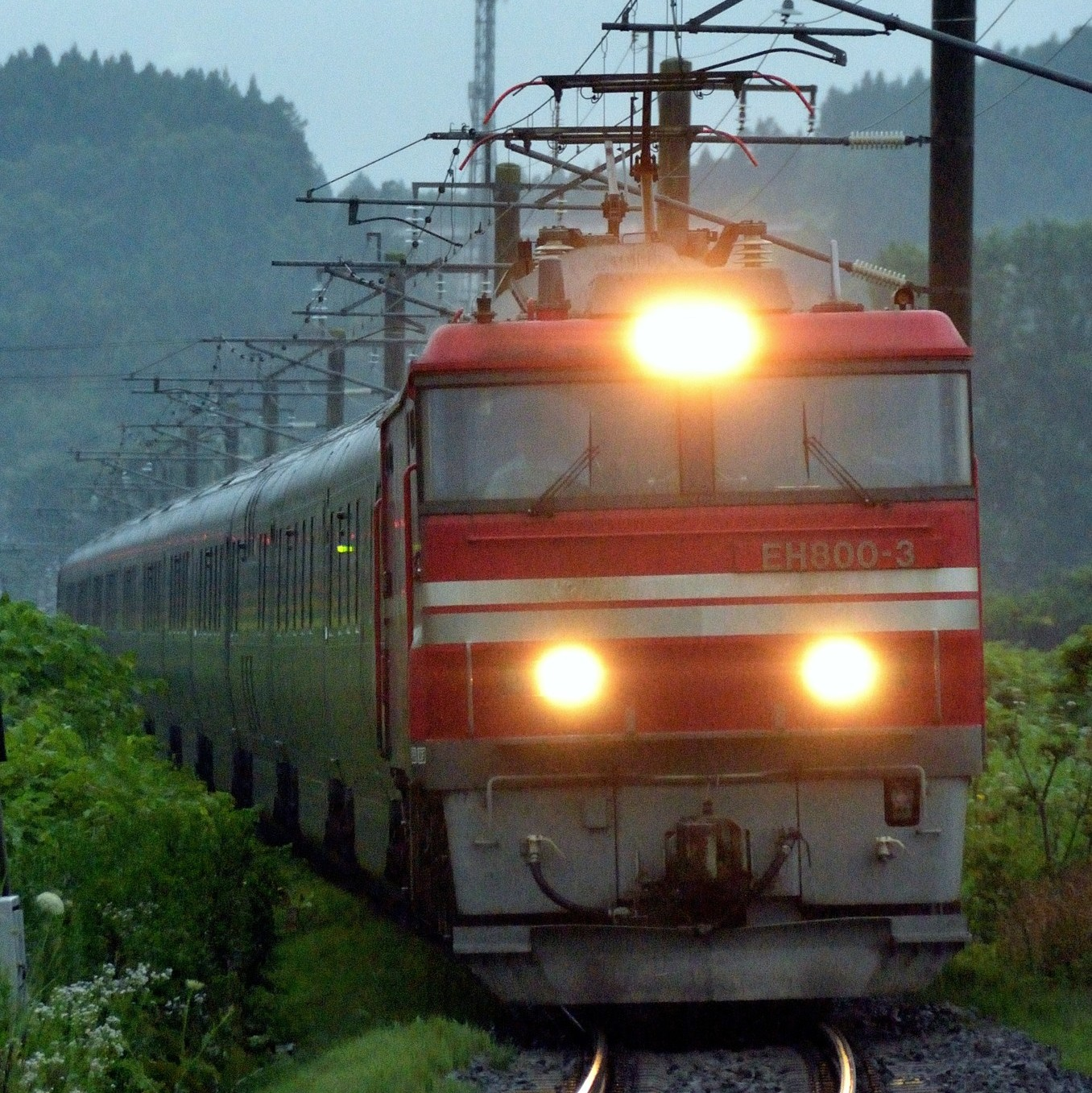
A Cassiopeia cruise train hauled by JR Freight Class EH800 electric locomotive EH800-3 in Hokkaido in July 2016

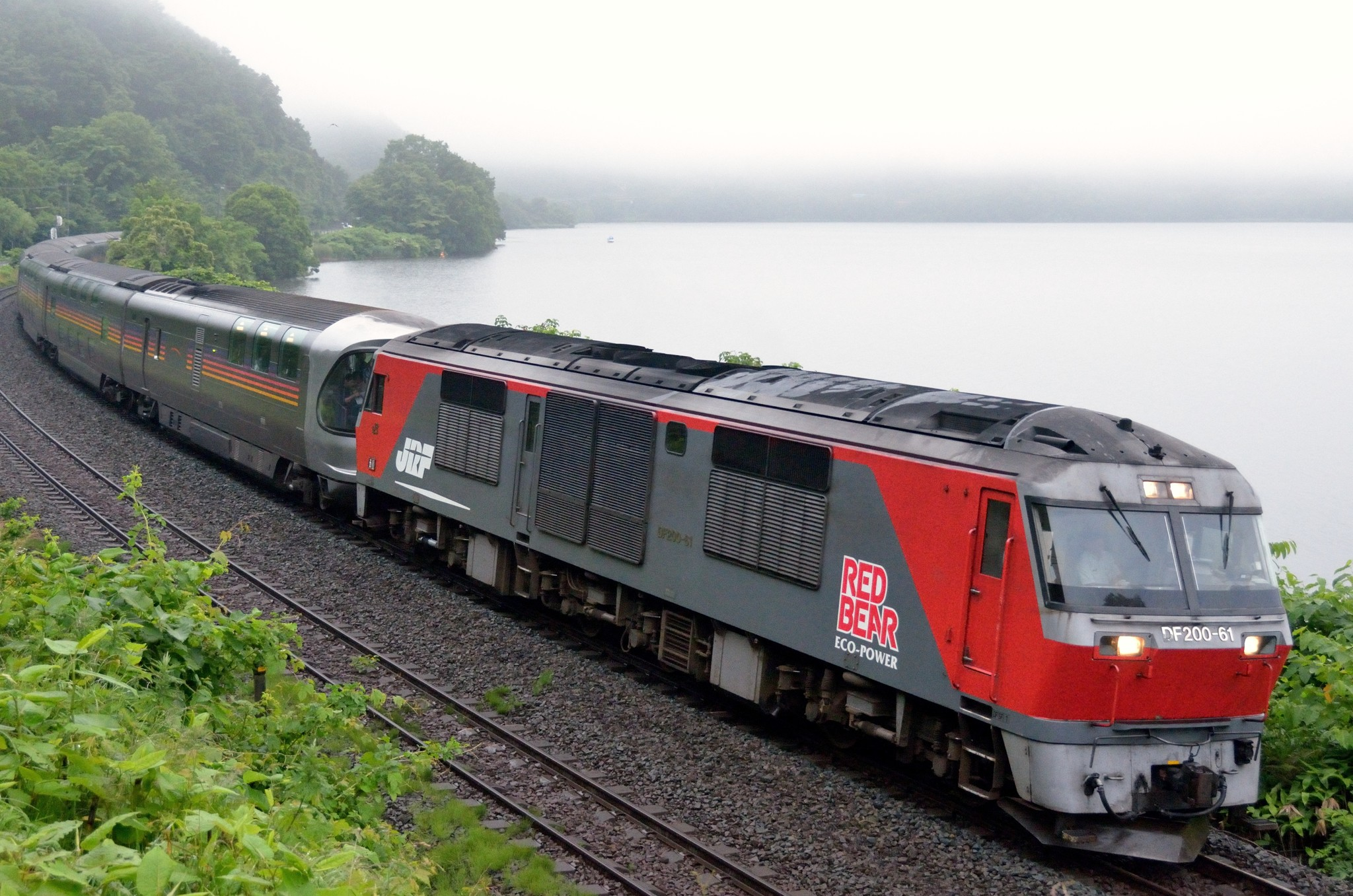
A Cassiopeia cruise train hauled by JR Freight Class DF200 diesel locomotive DF200-61 in Hokkaido in July 2016

== See also ==
- List of named passenger trains of Japan
- Hokutosei, another night train that ran between Tokyo and Sapporo until August 2015
- Seven Stars in Kyushu, a luxury sleeping car train operated by JR Kyushu
- Twilight Express Mizukaze, a luxury sleeping car excursion train operated by JR West in Japan
