= Yume Kūkan =

Japanese luxury railway coach set

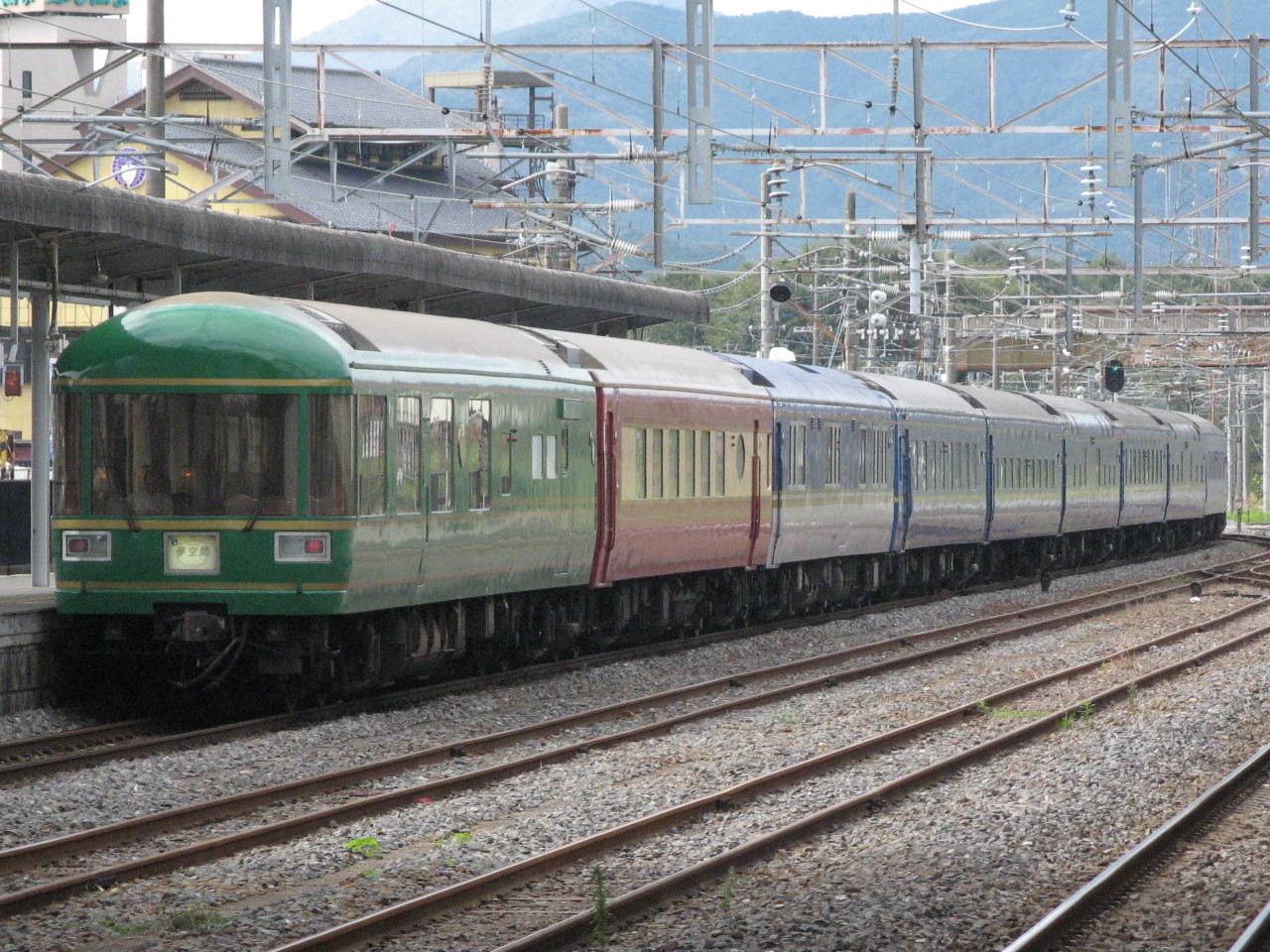
- Yume Kūkan coaches at the rear of a sleeping car service in October 2007
- In service: 1989 – March 2008
- Manufacturer: Fuji Heavy Industries, Nippon Sharyo, Tokyu Car
- Constructed: 1989
- Number built: 3 vehicles
- Number in service: None
- Number preserved: 3 vehicles
- Operators: JR East
- Depots: Oku

Specifications
- Track gauge: 1,067 mm (3 ft 6 in)

The Yume Kūkan (夢空間, lit. 'Dream Space') was a set of three luxury railway coaches operated by East Japan Railway Company (JR East) on overnight sleeping car services in Japan between 1989 and 2008.

== Operations ==
The three coaches were attached to the end of Hokutosei overnight sleeping car services between Ueno and Sapporo during holiday seasons, and branded as Yume Kūkan Hokutosei.

== Coach details ==
The Yume Kūkan set was formed of the following three coaches.

- OShi 25 901 dining car
- OHaFu 25 901 lounge car
- ORoNe 25 901 sleeping car

=== OShi 25 901 dining car ===
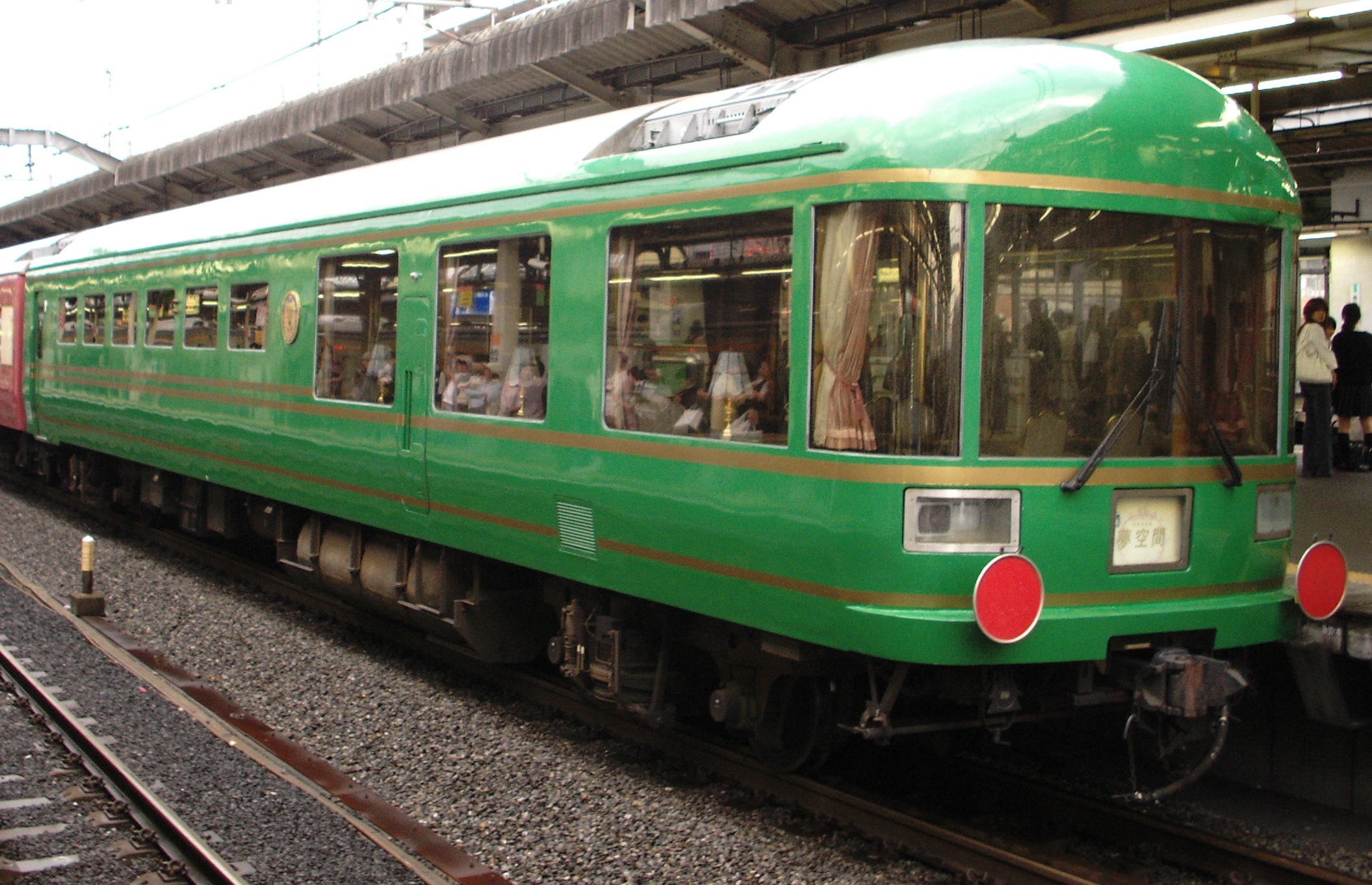
OShi 25 901 in May 2007

The OShi 25 901 dining car was built by Tokyu Car Corporation (present-day J-TREC), with the interior designed by Tokyu Department Store.

This coach provided seating for 18 diners in the observation saloon area, and for four diners in the central compartment area.

=== OHaFu 25 901 lounge car ===
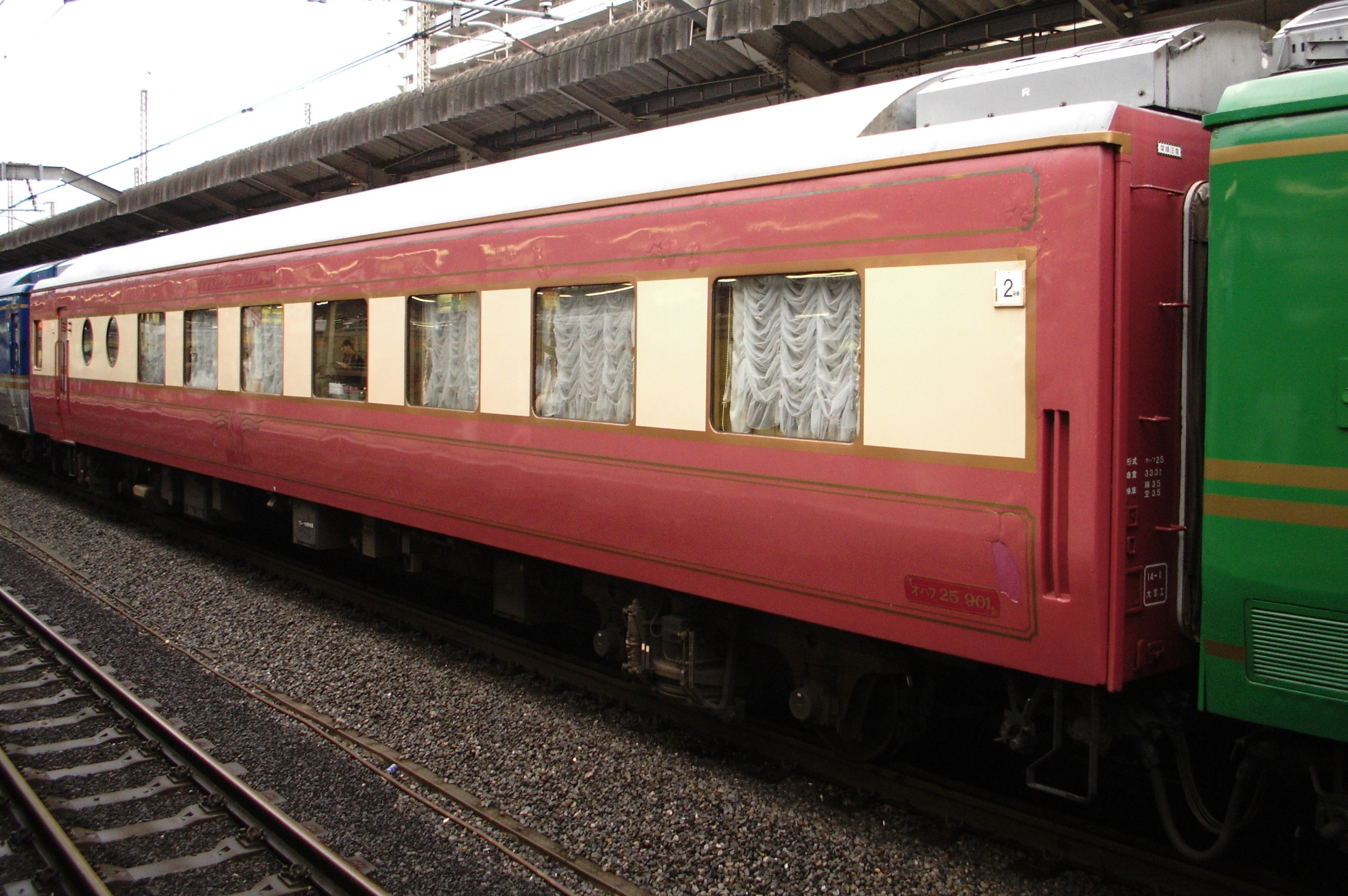
OHaFu 25 901 in May 2007

The OHaFu 25 901 lounge car was built by Fuji Heavy Industries, with the interior designed by Matsuya.

It features a bar counter, piano, and toilet facilities.

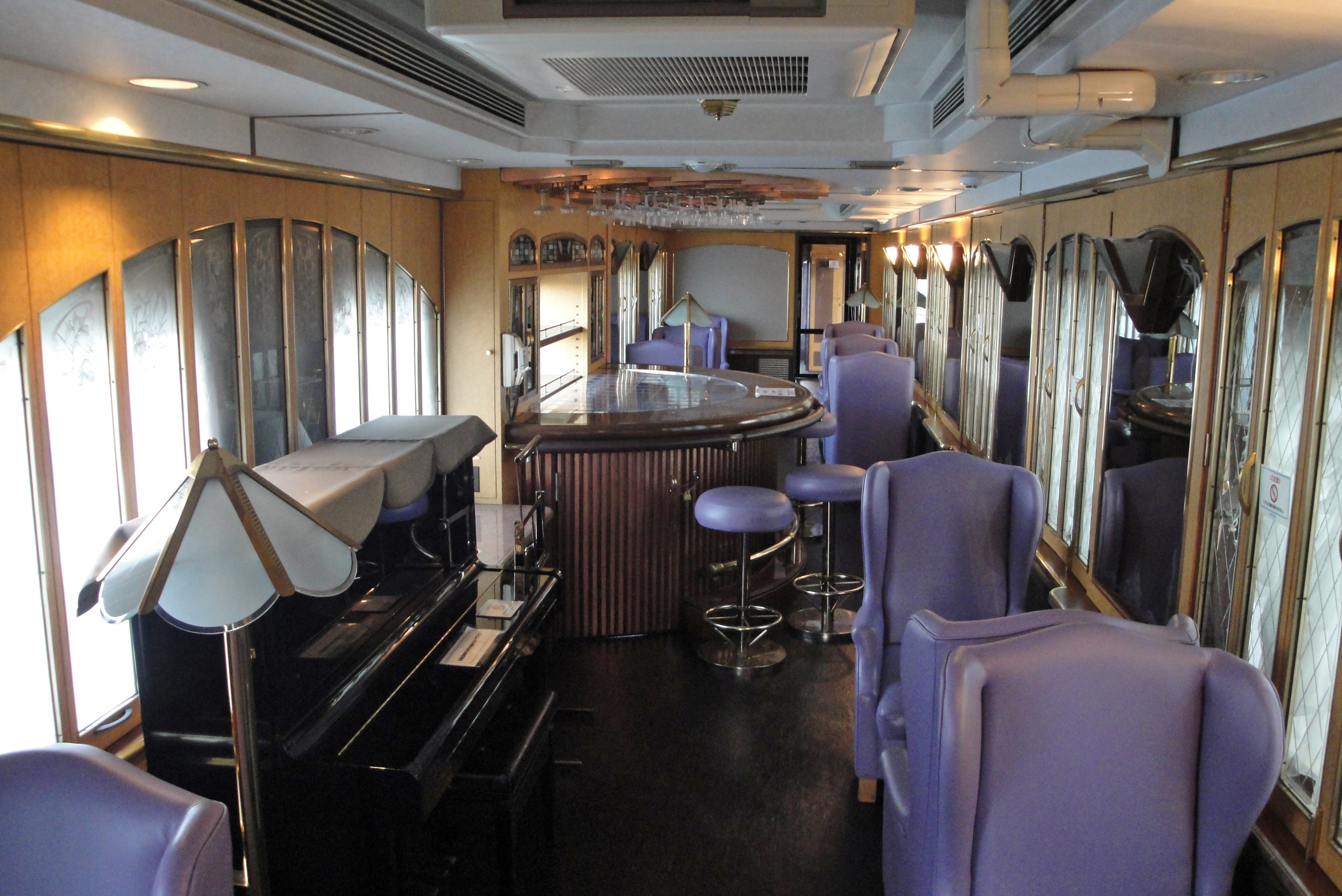
The interior of OHaFu 25 901 in preservation in May 2010

=== ORoNe 25 901 sleeping car ===
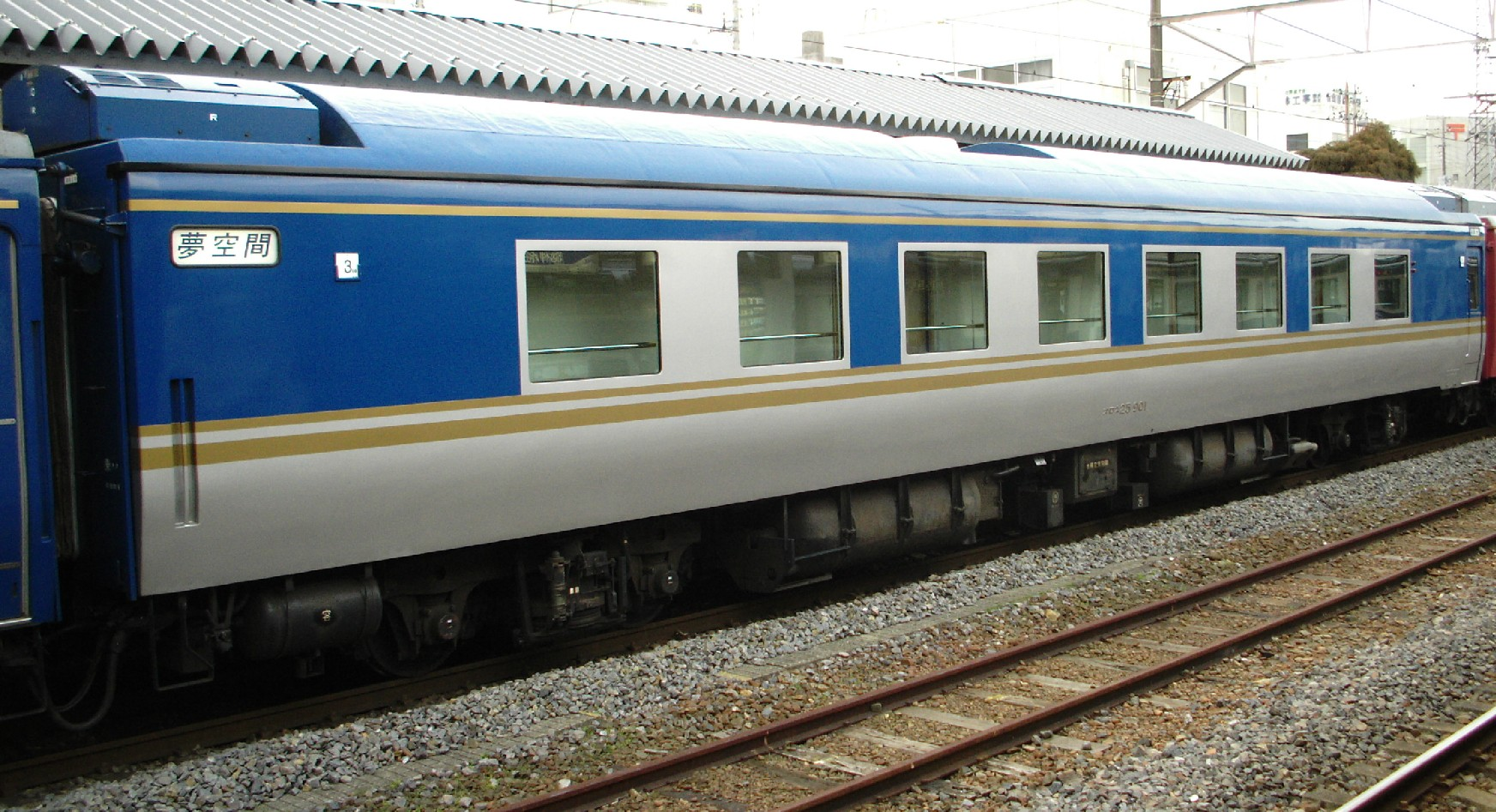
ORoNe 25 901 in March 2007

ORoNe 25 901 was a deluxe sleeping car with three compartments accommodating a total of six passengers. One compartment was a suite room consisting of a semi-double bed, a living room and bath/toilet facilities. The two other compartments were designated as "twin rooms" with two single beds and bath/toilet facilities. The suite room also featured a TV with satellite channel and video facilities.

The coach was built by Nippon Sharyo, with the interior designed by Takashimaya.

== History ==
The three Yume Kūkan coaches were built in 1989, and were displayed at the "Yokohama Exotic Showcase '89" event before entering service.

=== Withdrawal and preservation ===
Following a Sayonara Yume Kukan Hokutosei run between Ueno and Sapporo, the three coaches were taken out of service from March 2008, and stored at Oku Depot in Tokyo.

The OHaFu 25 901 lounge car and OShi 25 901 dining car were sold to Mitsui & Co., and in May 2009, the two coaches were moved to the Lalaport Shin-Misato shopping mall in Misato, Saitama, next to Shin-Misato Station, where they were used as cafe and rest area facilities when the mall opened in September of that year. The two coaches were not officially withdrawn from JR East books until 3 June 2009.

The ORoNe 25 901 sleeping car was moved to Koto, Tokyo in December 2011, and opened in February 2012 providing additional seating accommodation for the French restaurant "A ta Gueule".

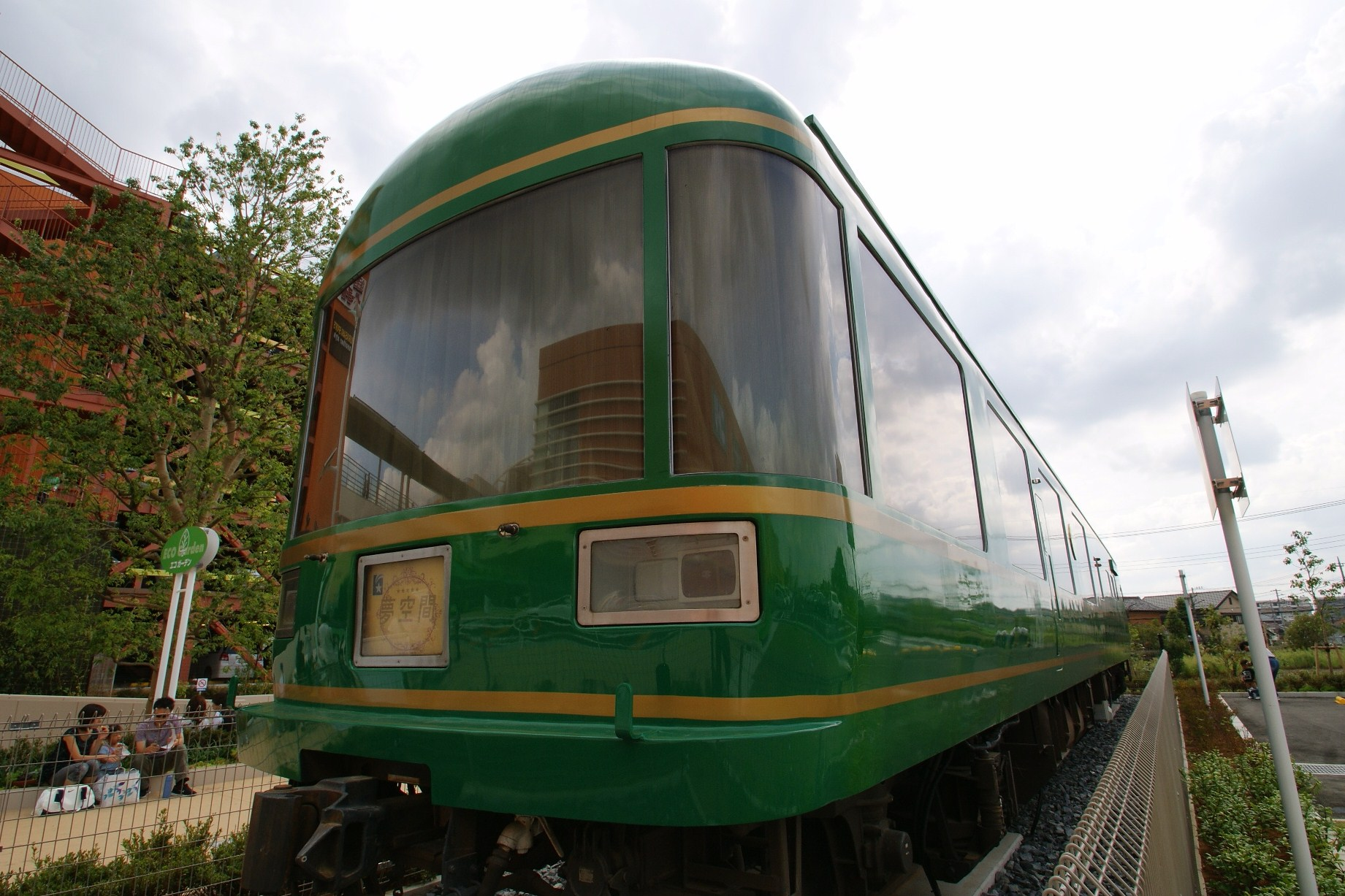
OShi 25 901 outside the Lalaport Shin-Misato shopping mall in September 2009

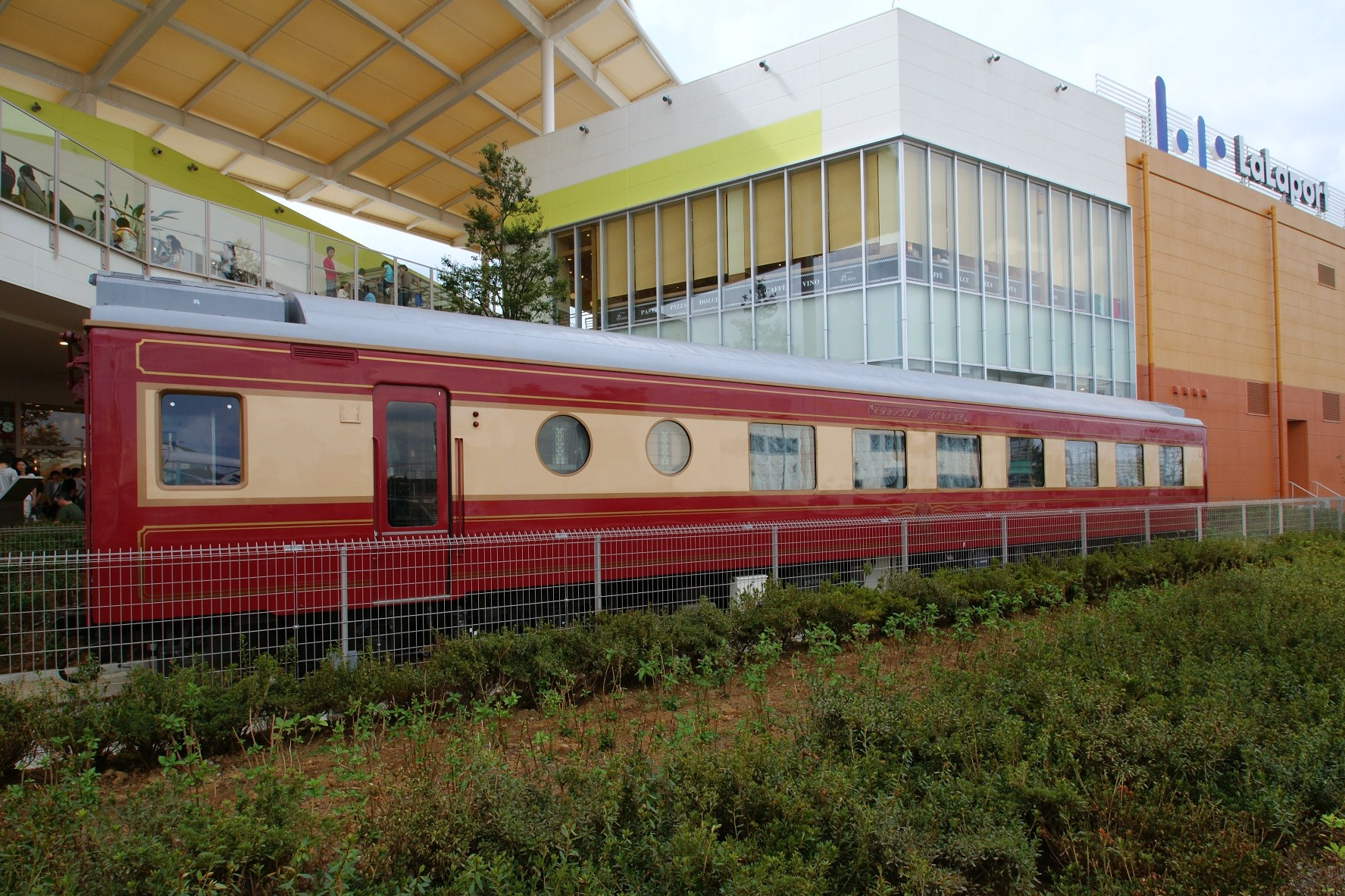
OHaFu 25 901 outside the Lalaport Shin-Misato shopping mall in September 2009

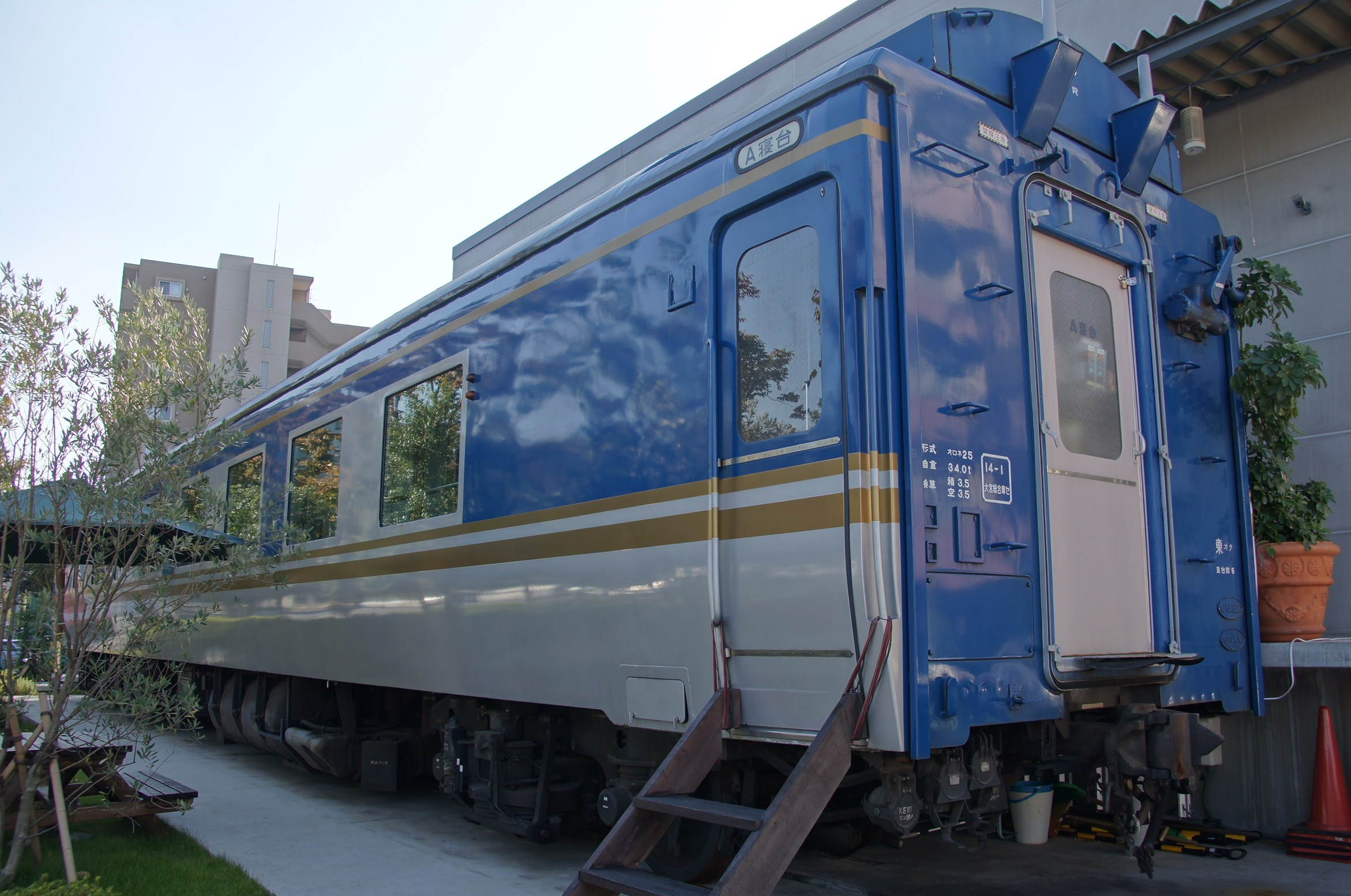
ORoNe 25 901 in Koto, Tokyo in October 2012

== See also ==
- Blue Train (Japan), the generic name for sleeping car trains in Japan
- List of named passenger trains of Japan
