= Hokutosei =

Japanese overnight train service

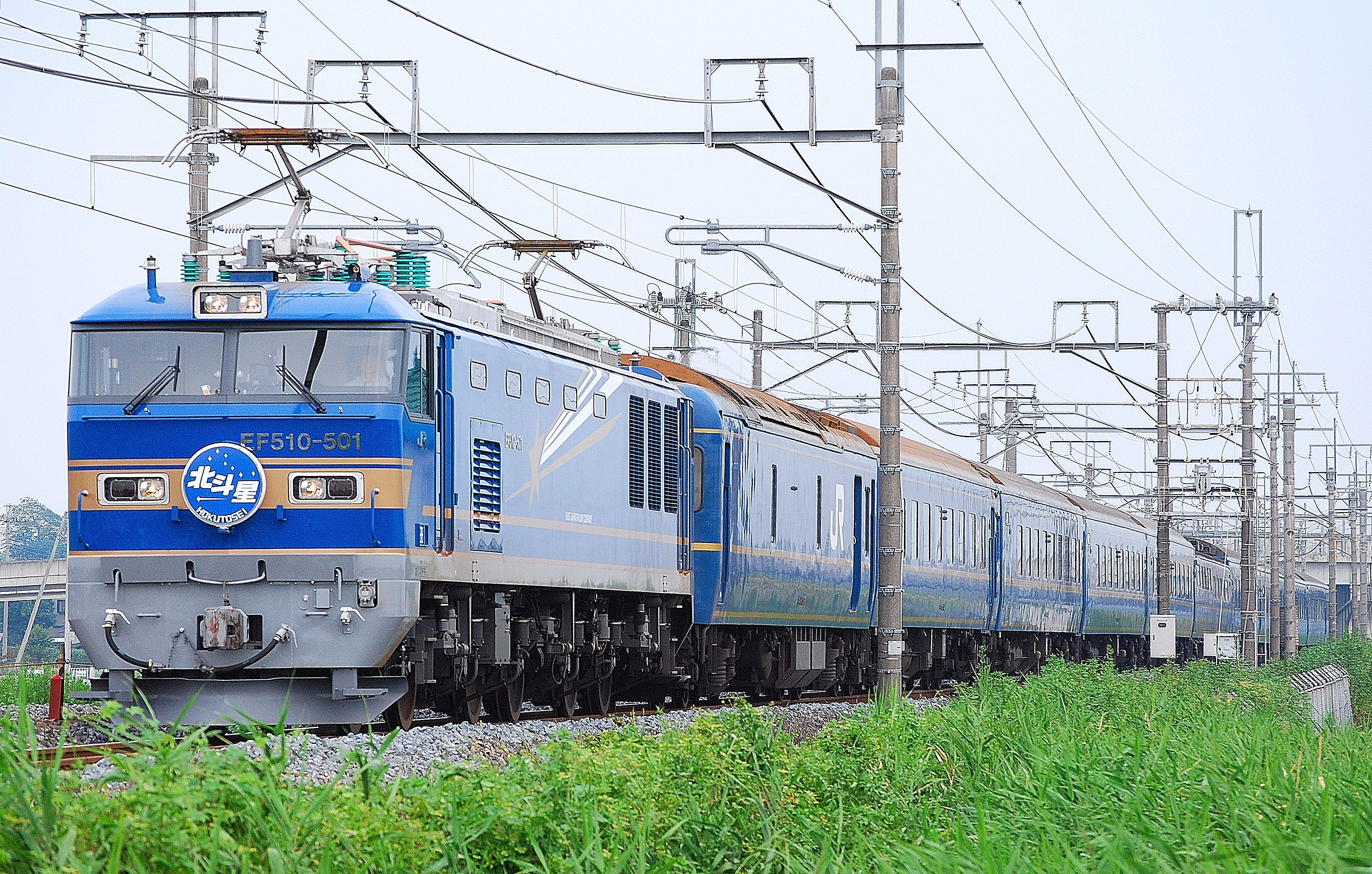
- A Hokutosei service hauled by a JR East Class EF510 electric locomotive in September 2010

Overview
- Service type: Limited express
- Status: Discontinued
- Locale: Japan
- First service: 13 March 1988
- Last service: 22 August 2015
- Former operator(s): JR East and JR Hokkaido

Route
- Termini: Ueno; Sapporo
- Line(s) used: Tohoku Main Line, Iwate Ginga Railway Line, Aoimori Railway, Tsugaru-Kaikyō Line, Hakodate Main Line, Muroran Main Line, Chitose Line, Hakodate Main Line

On-board services
- Catering facilities: Dining car

Technical
- Rolling stock: 24 series sleeping cars EF510-500 electric locomotive ED79 electric locomotive DD51 diesel locomotives
- Track gauge: 1,067 mm (3 ft 6 in)
- Electrification: 1,500 V DC / 20 kV AC (50 Hz)
- Operating speed: 110 km/h (70 mph)

The Hokutosei (北斗星) was a limited express sleeping car train service in Japan which operated between Ueno Station in Tokyo and Sapporo Station in the northern island of Hokkaido, taking approximately 16.5 hours. It was operated jointly by East Japan Railway Company (JR East) and Hokkaido Railway Company (JR Hokkaido) from March 1988. The service became a seasonal service from the 14 March 2015 timetable revision, and was completely discontinued in August 2015, in preparation for the opening of the Hokkaido Shinkansen.

== Route ==
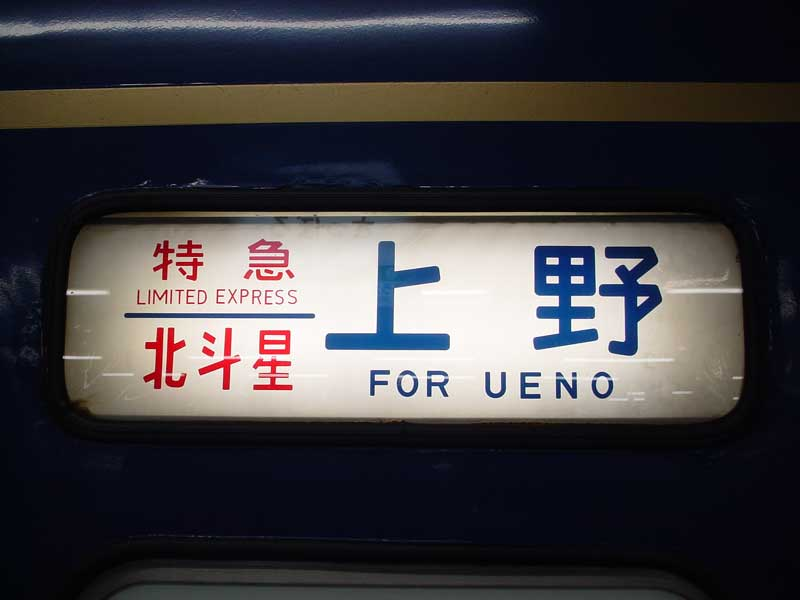
Hokutosei train destination indicator

Going from Ueno to Sapporo, trains called at Ōmiya, Utsunomiya, Kōriyama, Fukushima, and Sendai. One train made additional stops at Ichinoseki and Morioka. The first stop in Hokkaido was at Hakodate, with arrival in Sapporo around five hours later.

The Hokutosei ran on the following lines:

=== JR East area ===
- Tohoku Main Line, Ueno – Morioka
- Iwate Galaxy Railway Line, Morioka – Metoki
- Aoimori Railway, Metoki – Aomori

=== JR Hokkaido ===
- Tsugaru-Kaikyō Line, Aomori – Hakodate
- Hakodate Main Line, Hakodate – Oshamambe
- Muroran Main Line, Oshamambe – Numanohata
- Chitose Line, Numanohata – Shiroishi
- Hakodate Main Line, Shiroishi – Sapporo

Trains reversed and swapped locomotives at Aomori and Hakodate stations. The Tsugaru-Kaikyō Line consists of the Tsugaru Line, Kaikyō Line, Esashi Line, and Hakodate Main Line.

== Accommodation and facilities ==
=== Sleeping accommodation ===
The Hokutosei consisted of type "A" and type "B" accommodation. Users of the Japan Rail Pass were waived the basic track fare, however the limited express fare and accommodations fare still applied.

==== Type A ====
Type A compartments were larger and had more amenities than their type B counterparts. There were two types of type A compartments: "Royal" and "Twin Deluxe".

Royal rooms were single-person private compartments, although they could be used by two people with the use of a supplementary bed. There were two Royal rooms in each of cars 9 and 10.

Twin Deluxe rooms were private two-person rooms, all eight of which were located in car 8.

==== Type B ====
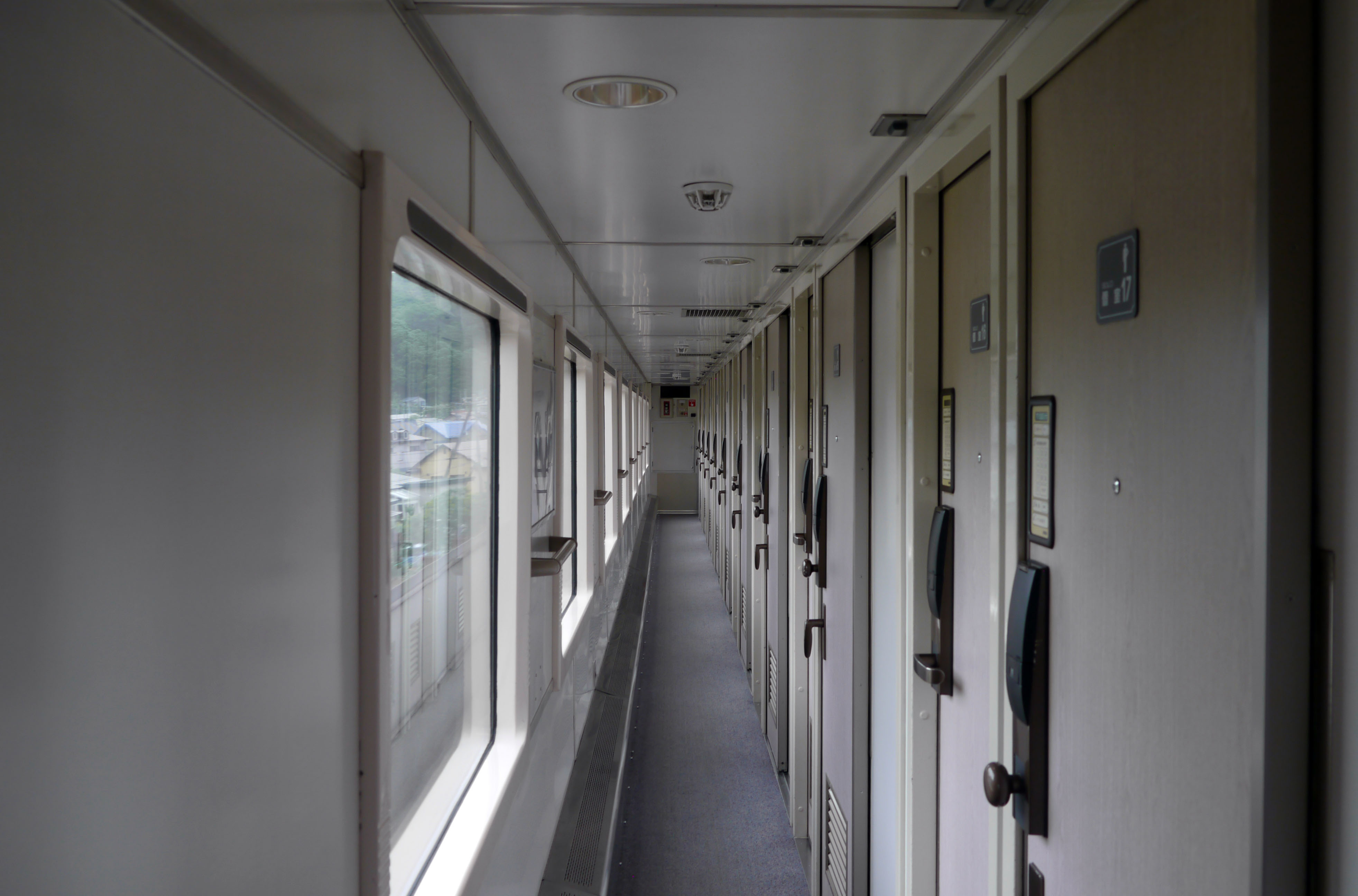
Corridor in one of the type B sleeper cars

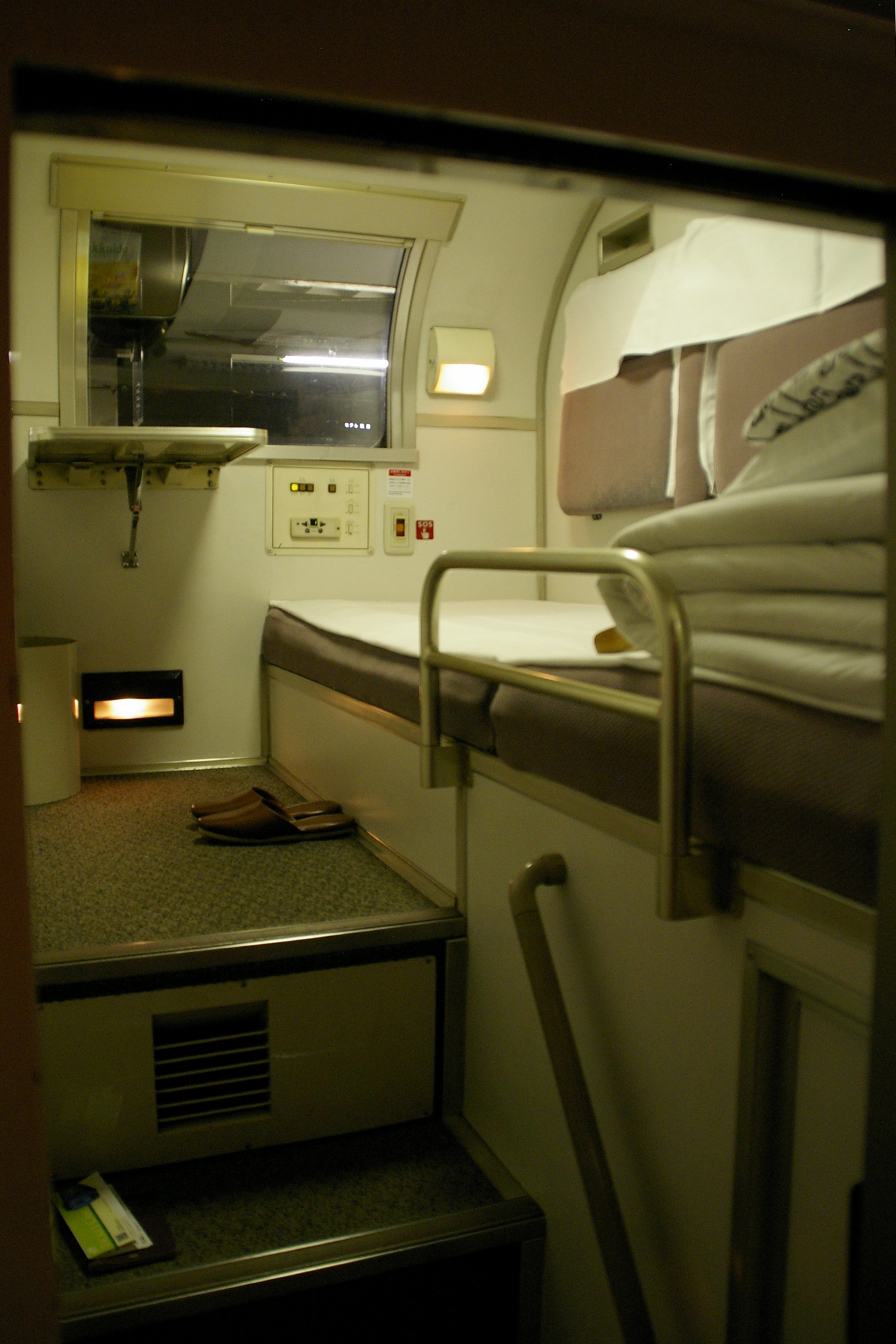
A type B upper-floor solo room

Type B compartments were smaller and less expensive than type A compartments. There were three types of type B compartments: "Duet", "Solo", and "Two-level Type B". All type B compartments carried an accommodation fare of ¥6,300 per person.

Duet compartments were private two-person compartments. There were both upper-level and lower-level types.

Solo compartments were private single-person compartments. As with Duet compartments, there were both upper-level and lower-level types.

Two-level Type B couchettes had four beds which could be individually enclosed with a curtain. While normally used by individual travelers, there were also "B Compartments", which had a door that could be closed and used as a private room for a group of four people (or fewer if the travelers wished to pay for the extra bed(s)).

=== Dining car ===
The Hokutosei's dining car, called the "Grand Chariot", served various foods and beverages. The availability of foods in the Grand Chariot depended on whether it was the predesignated "Dinner Time", "Pub Time", or "Morning Time".

==== Dinner Time ====
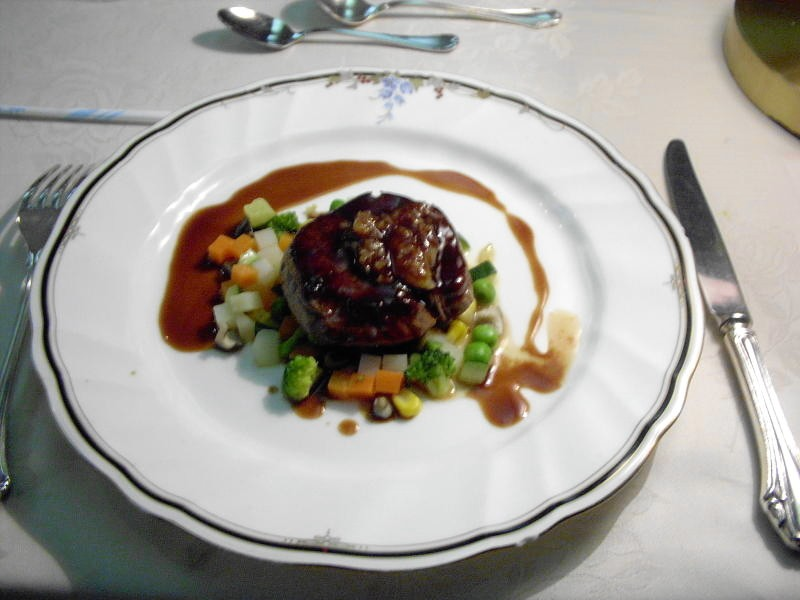
A course from the French dinner

French or Japanese cuisine was served during Dinner Time. Passengers who wished to have either course had to make a dinner reservation at a Midori no Madoguchi ticket office up to three days prior to departure.

==== Pub Time ====
An announcement sounded at the conclusion of Dinner Time, after which Pub Time began. During Pub Time the dining car opened to all passengers and various à la carte meals, snacks, and beverages were available for purchase. Prior reservations were not needed. Last order was at 10:30 pm, and the car closed at 11:00 pm.

==== Morning Time ====
During Morning Time, breakfast was served from 6:30 am. Both western-style and Japanese-style food was served.

== Rolling stock ==
The train was formed of 24 series sleeping cars based at JR East's Oku Depot in Tokyo and JR Hokkaido's Sapporo Depot, typically consisting of 12 cars including a KaNi24 generator car. From Ueno to Aomori the train was hauled by a JR East Class EF510-500 dual-voltage electric locomotive, by a JR Hokkaido Class ED79 AC electric locomotive between Aomori and Hakodate, and by a pair of JR Hokkaido Class DD51 diesel locomotives between Hakodate and Sapporo.

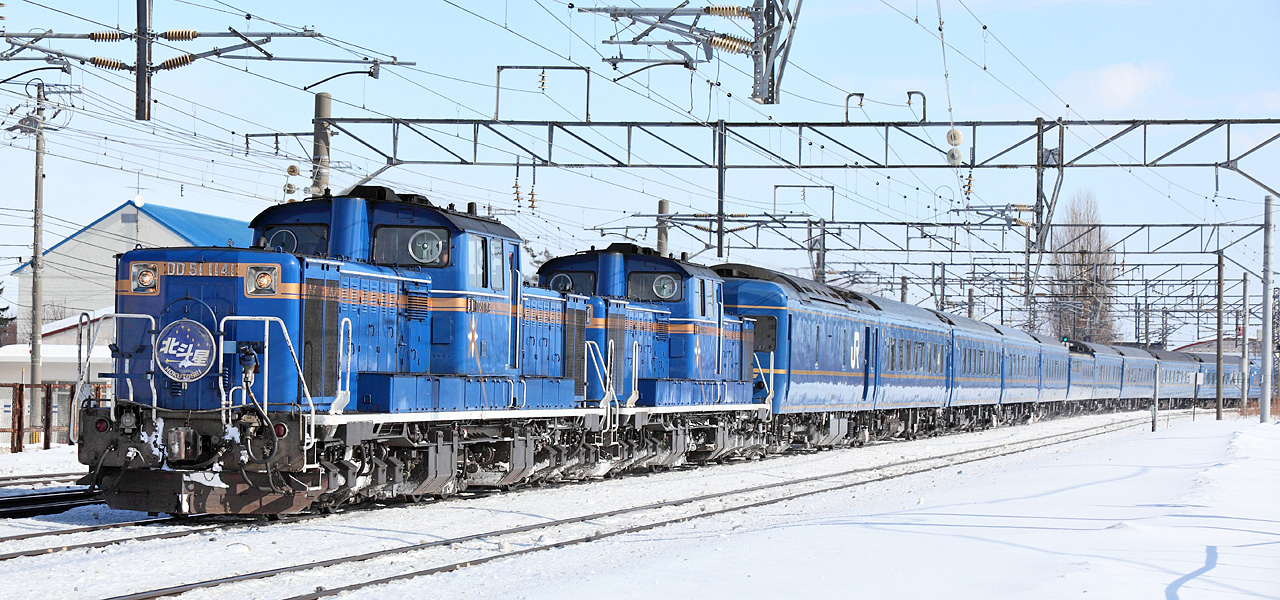
The Hokutosei hauled by a pair of JR Hokkaido DD51 diesel locomotives in Hokkaido, February 2010

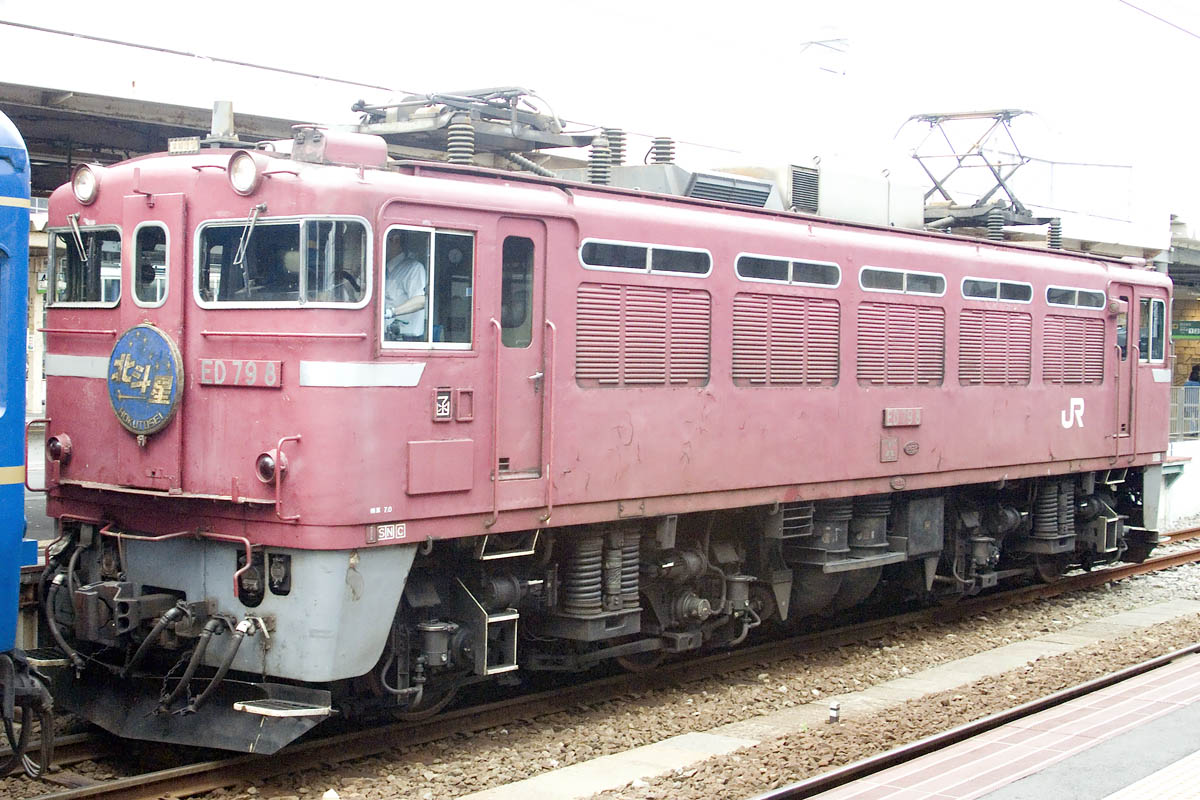
ED79 8 at Hakodate Station after arriving on a Hokutosei overnight sleeping car service, July 2004

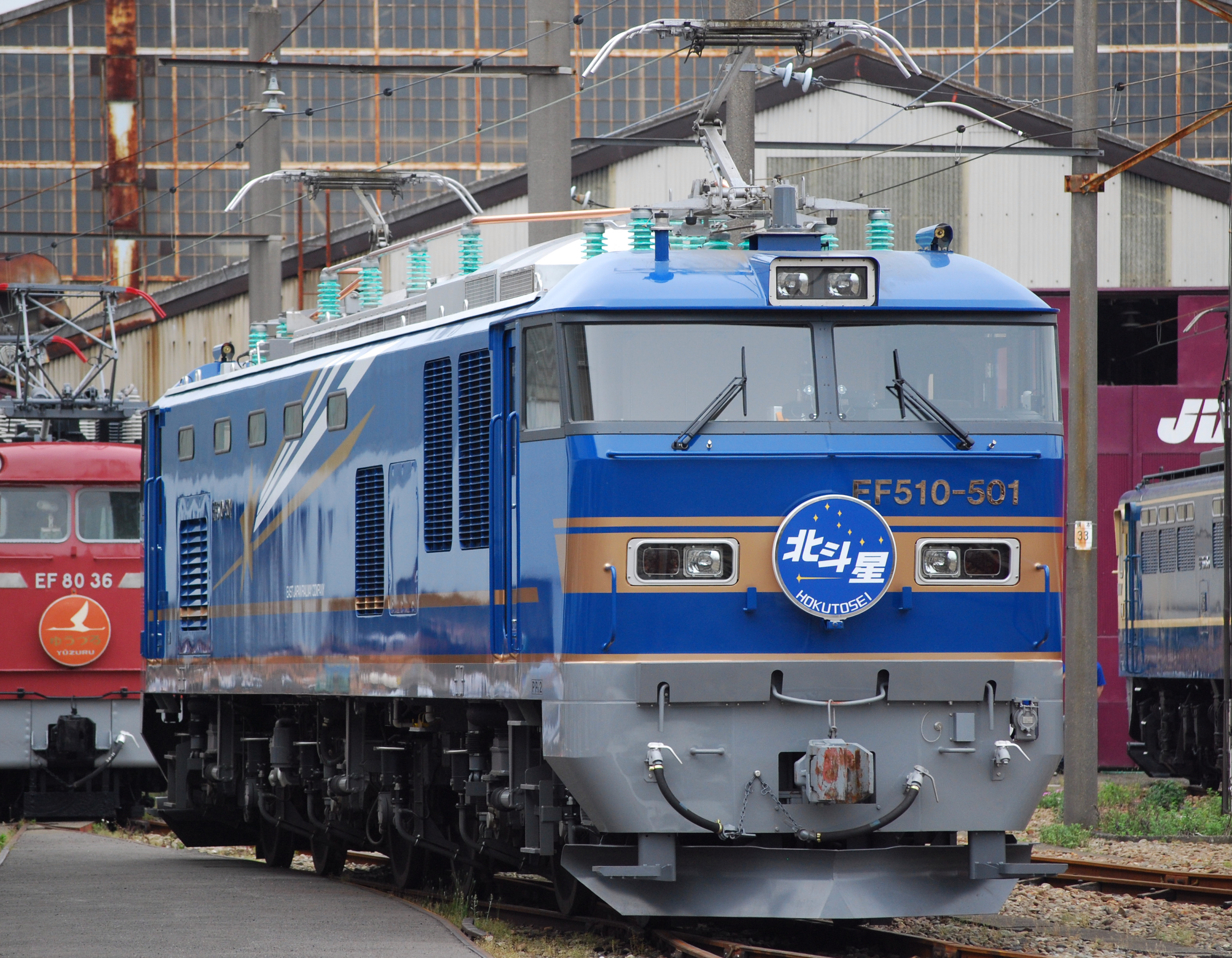
EF510-501, May 2010

=== Formation ===
As of April 2015, the trains were formed as shown below.

| Car No. | 1 | 2 | 3 | 4 | 5 | 6 | 7 | 8 | 9 | 10 | 11 | |
|---|---|---|---|---|---|---|---|---|---|---|---|---|
| Numbering | OHaNeFu 25 | ORoNe 24-500 | ORoHaNe 25-500 | ORoHaNe 24-500 | OHaNeFu 25 | OHa 25-500 | SuShi 24-500 | ORoNe 24-500 | ORoHaNe 25-500 | ORoHaNe 24-500 | OHaNeFu 25 | KaNi 24 |
| Facilities | B-type couchettes | A-type compartments | A/B-type compartments | A/B-type compartments | B-type couchettes | Lounge car /Showers | Dining car | A-type compartments | A/B-type compartments | A/B-type compartments | B-type couchettes | Generator van |

Cars 1 to 6 were owned by JR Hokkaido, and cars 7 to 11 (plus the generator van) were owned by JR East from March 2008 to March 2015. After that, all cars were owned by JR East.

=== Past locomotives ===
The train used to be hauled between Ueno and Aomori by a JR East Tabata-based Class EF81 dual-voltage electric locomotive, however from July 2010 this work was taken over by the Class EF510-500. Until its removal from service in 2001, ED76-551 hauled the Hokutosei between Aomori and Hakodate. It was subsequently replaced by the Class ED79.

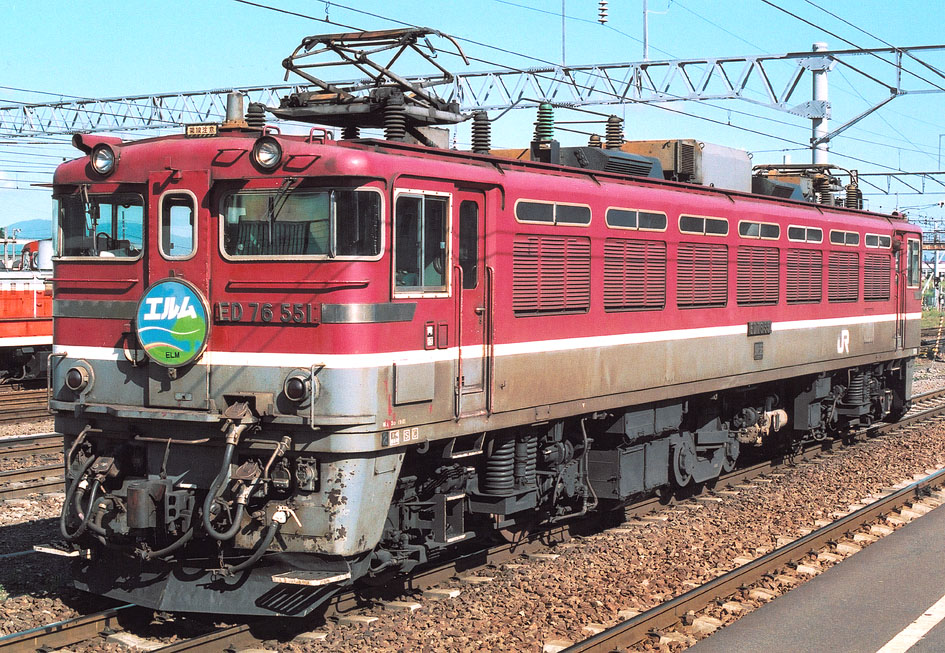
ED76-551 hauling the Elm sleeper train

== History ==
Plans to operate a direct sleeping car service between Tokyo and Sapporo were officially announced on 24 April 1987, with the timetable for three trains daily in each direction unveiled in July 1987. A public ballot was held to decide on the name for the new train service, and approximately 24,000 votes were received. The name Hokutosei was officially chosen on 6 November 1987, although it had ranked in 108th place in the public ballot with just 15 votes. The first place suggestion, Kaikyo, was later used as the name for the limited-stop "rapid" services connecting Aomori with Hakodate via the Seikan Tunnel.

The Hokutosei, named after the Big Dipper constellation, was introduced on 13 March 1988 to coincide with the opening of the Seikan Tunnel, an undersea tunnel which connects the island of Hokkaido to Honshu.

Until 1990 the service ran with two trains daily in each direction, and an additional third round-trip route being run irregularly. In 1990 all trains began to run regularly, however, with the introduction of the Cassiopeia in 1999, services were cut back to two daily round-trip services. From 15 March 2008, the service was cut back from two trains daily in each direction to one train in each direction.

From the start of the revised timetable on 17 March 2012, smoking was banned in the restaurant cars of Hokutosei services.

Up until March 2015, trains were typically formed as follows.

| Car No. | 1 | 2 | 3 | 4 | 5 | 6 | 7 | 8 | 9 | 10 | 11 | |
|---|---|---|---|---|---|---|---|---|---|---|---|---|
| Numbering | OHaNeFu 25 | OHaNeFu 25-500 | OHaNe 25-560 | OHaNe 25-560 | OHaNe 25-550 | SuHaNe 25-500 | SuShi 24-500 | ORoNe 24-500 | ORoHaNe 25-500 | ORoHaNe 24-500 | OHaNeFu 25 | KaNi 24 |
| Facilities | B-type couchettes | B-type couchettes | B-type compartments | B-type compartments | B-type compartments | B-type compartments / Mini lounge /Showers | Dining car | A-type compartments | A/B-type compartments | A/B-type compartments | B-type couchettes | Generator van |

Cars 1 to 6 were owned by JR Hokkaido, and cars 7 to 11 (plus the generator van) were owned by JR East.

From the 14 March 2015 timetable revision, regular Hokutosei services were discontinued, with trains subsequently running only as seasonal services during the peak holiday periods. It was completely discontinued in August 2015, with the last down train from Ueno departing on 21 August, and the last up train from Sapporo departing on 22 August. The final two trains were both hauled by locomotive number EF510-515 between Aomori and Ueno.

== Preservation ==
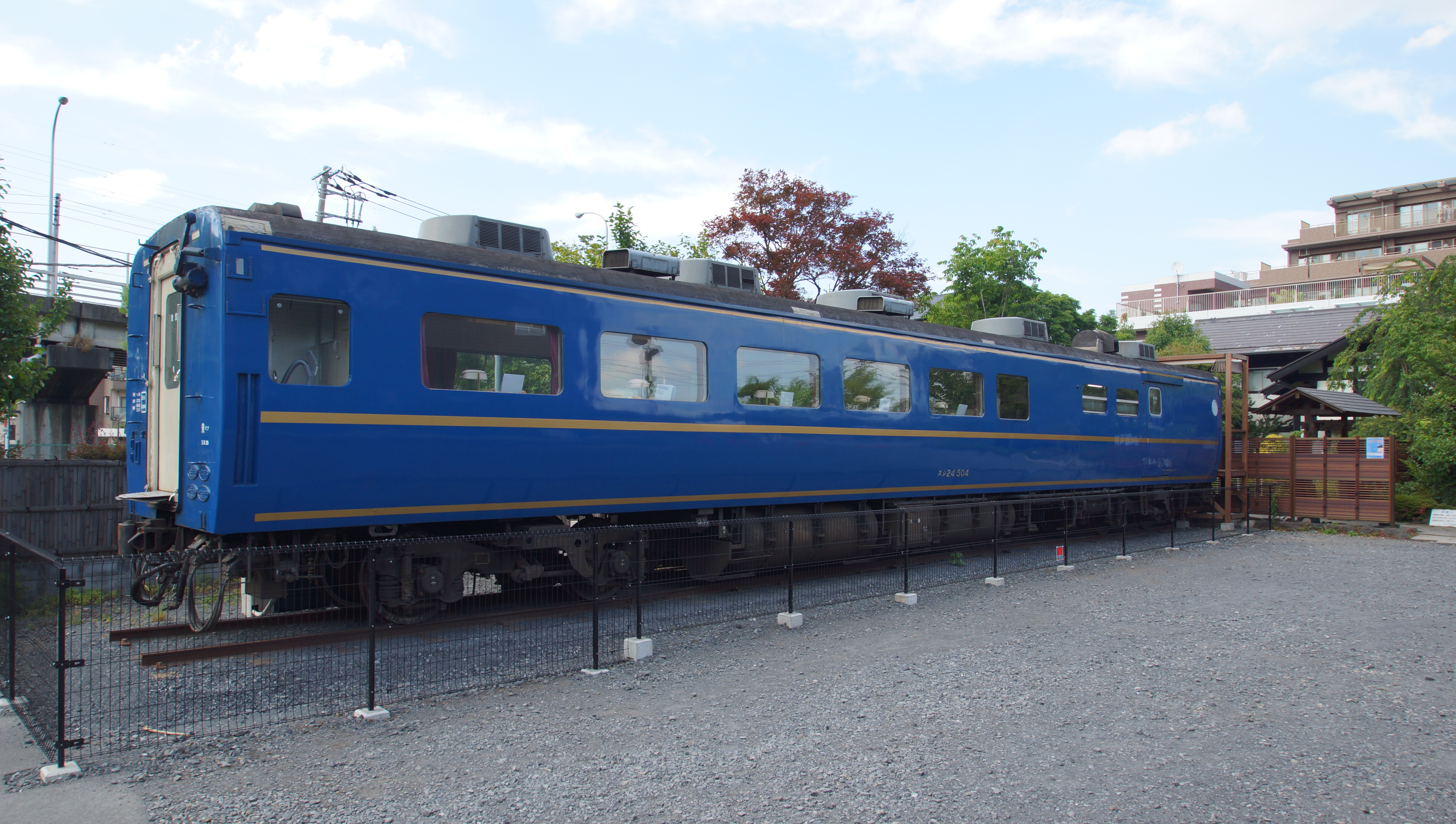
24 series dining car SuShi 24-504 in use as a restaurant in Saitama Prefecture in June 2016

A 24 series dining car (number SuShi 24-504) formerly used on Hokutosei services was purchased for use as a restaurant in Kawaguchi, Saitama in April 2016. A hostel using many interior fittings from the original train was opened in Tokyo in December 2016.

== See also ==
- Blue Train (Japan)
- List of named passenger trains of Japan
- Yume Kūkan, a set of luxury coaches that were connected at the end of the Hokutosei service on a limited number of services.
