= JR Freight Class EF510 =

Japanese electric locomotive type

Class EF510
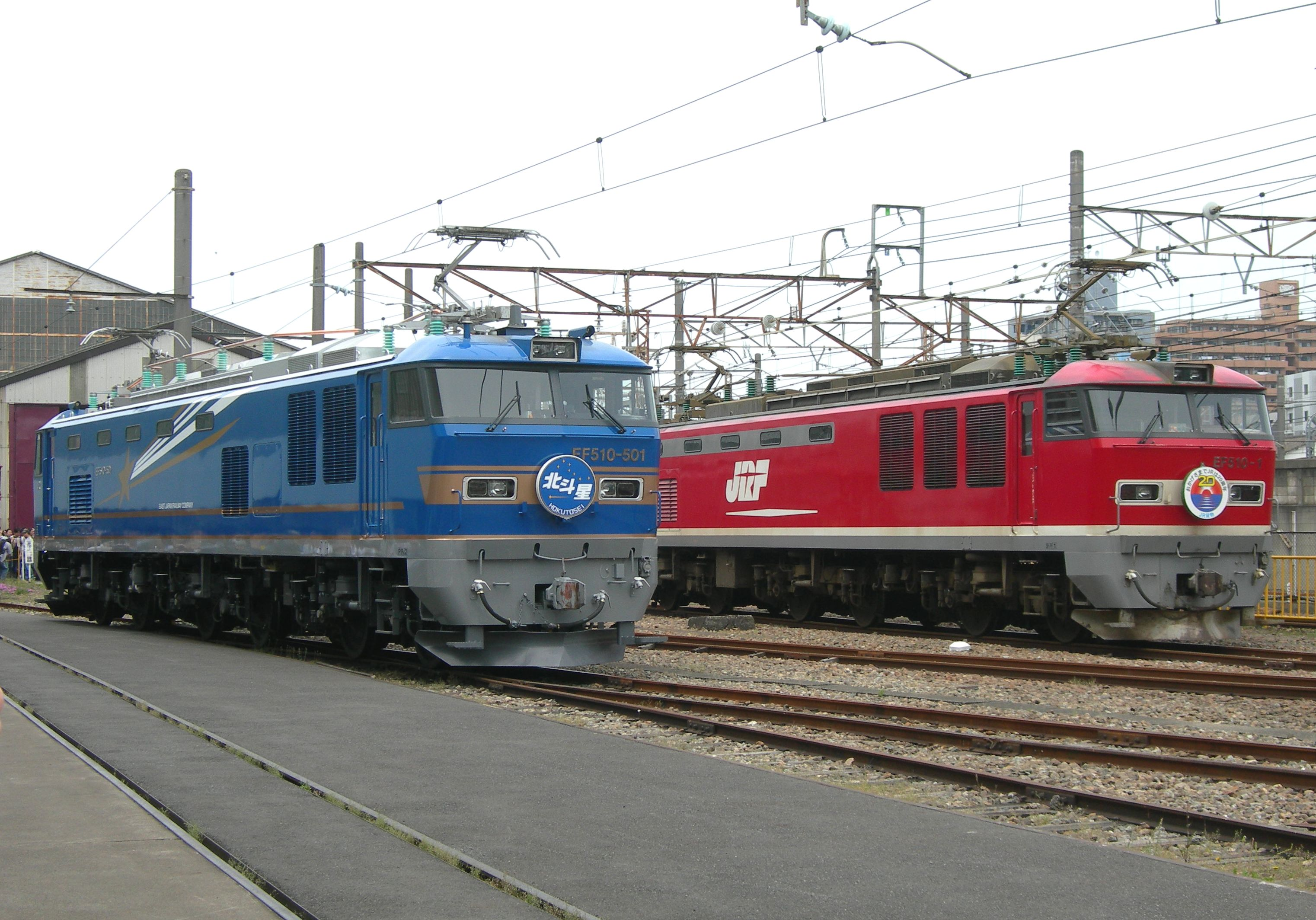
- JR East EF510-501 and JR Freight EF510-1, May 2010
Type and origin
- Power type: Electric
- Builder: Kawasaki Heavy Industries
- Build date: 2001–
Specifications
- Configuration
  - UIC: Bo′Bo′Bo′
- Gauge: 1,067 mm (3 ft 6 in)
- Bogies: FD7N (outer), FD8A (centre)
- Length: 19,800 mm (64 ft 11 1/2 in)
- Width: 2,970 mm (9 ft 8 7/8 in)
- Height: 4,280 mm (14 ft 1/2 in)
- Loco weight: 100.8 t (99.2 long tons; 111.1 short tons)
- Electric system/s: 1,500 V DC & 20 kV AC at 50/60 Hz overhead wire
- Current pickup: pantograph
- Traction motors: FMT4 x 6
- Gear ratio: 5.13 (82/16)
- Safety systems: ATS-PF, ATS-SF (JR Freight)
Performance figures
- Maximum speed: 110 km/h (70 mph)
- Power output: 3,390 kW (4,550 hp)
- Tractive effort: 199 kN (45,000 lb_{f})
Career
- Operators: ■ JR Freight (2002 -); ■ JR East (June 2010 - March 2016)
- Number in class: 40 (as of 1 April 2016)
- First run: 2002

The Class EF510 (EF510形) is a Bo-Bo-Bo wheel arrangement multi-voltage AC/DC electric locomotive type operated by JR Freight and East Japan Railway Company (JR East) in Japan since 2002. As of 1 April 2016, the fleet consists of 40 locomotives (24 EF510-0s and 16 EF510-500s), all based at Toyama Depot.

== Design ==
The design used many components common with the Class EF210, and was intended to replace ageing Class EF81 locomotives on freight services operating along the Sea of Japan coastal routes.

== Variants ==
- EF510-0: Locomotives EF510-1 – built from 2001 for JR Freight
- EF510-500: Locomotives EF510-501 – 515, built 2009–2010 originally for JR East
- EF510-300: Locomotives EF510-301 onwards, built from 2021 for JR Freight

The class is subdivided into the original EF510-0 sub-class operated by JR Freight and fifteen EF510-500 sub-class locomotives ordered and originally operated on passenger services by JR East. As of 1 October 2013, there were 23 EF510-0 locomotives and 15 EF510-500 locomotives in service.

== Class EF510-0 ==
The first locomotive, EF510-1, was delivered in February 2002 and initially based at Shin-Tsurumi Depot before being transferred to Toyama Depot in 2002. The first full-production locomotive, EF510-2, was delivered in November 2003, and this and subsequent locomotives delivered featured "Red Thunder" bodyside branding.

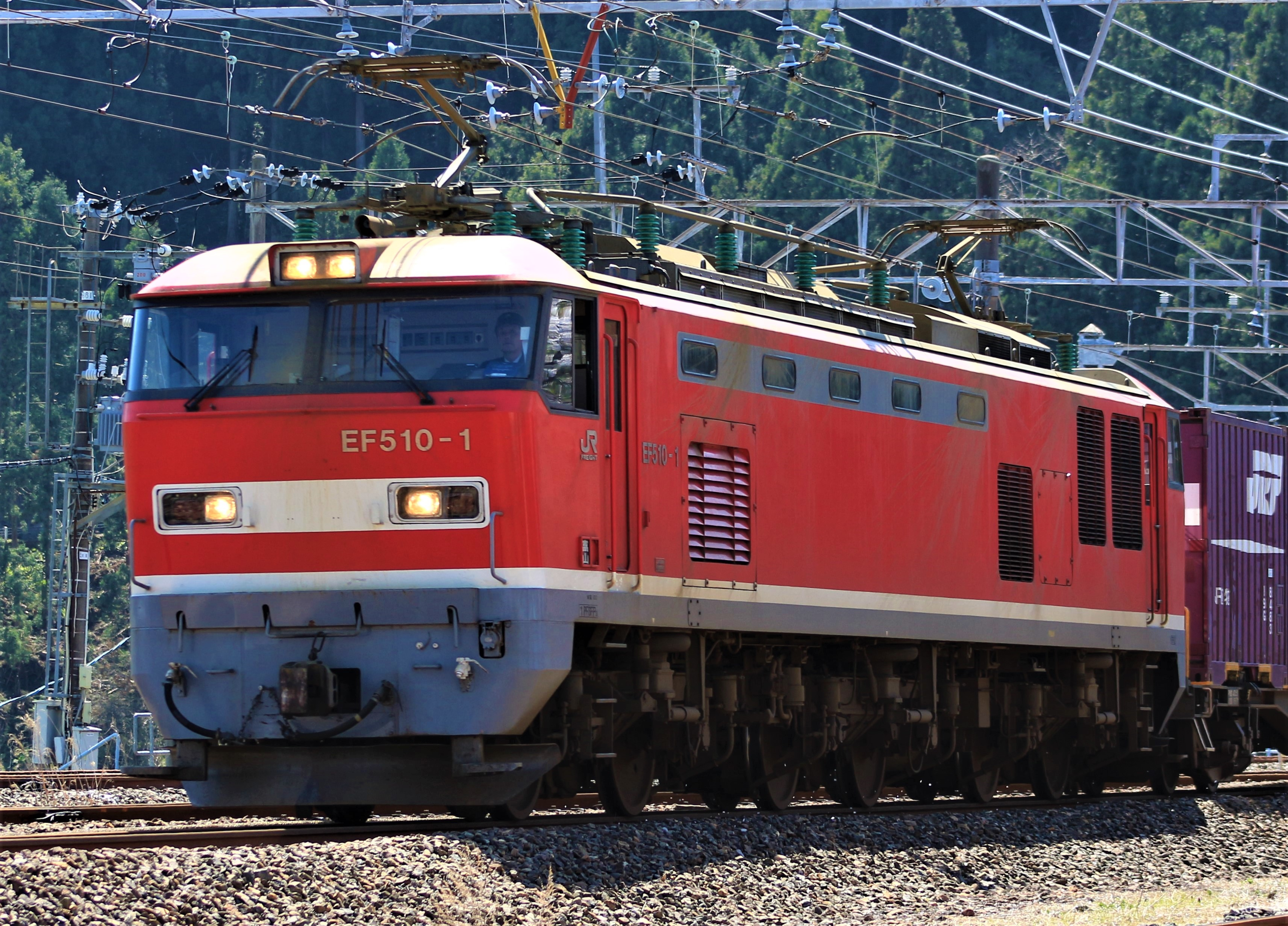
EF510-1 in April 2022, without "Red Thunder" branding

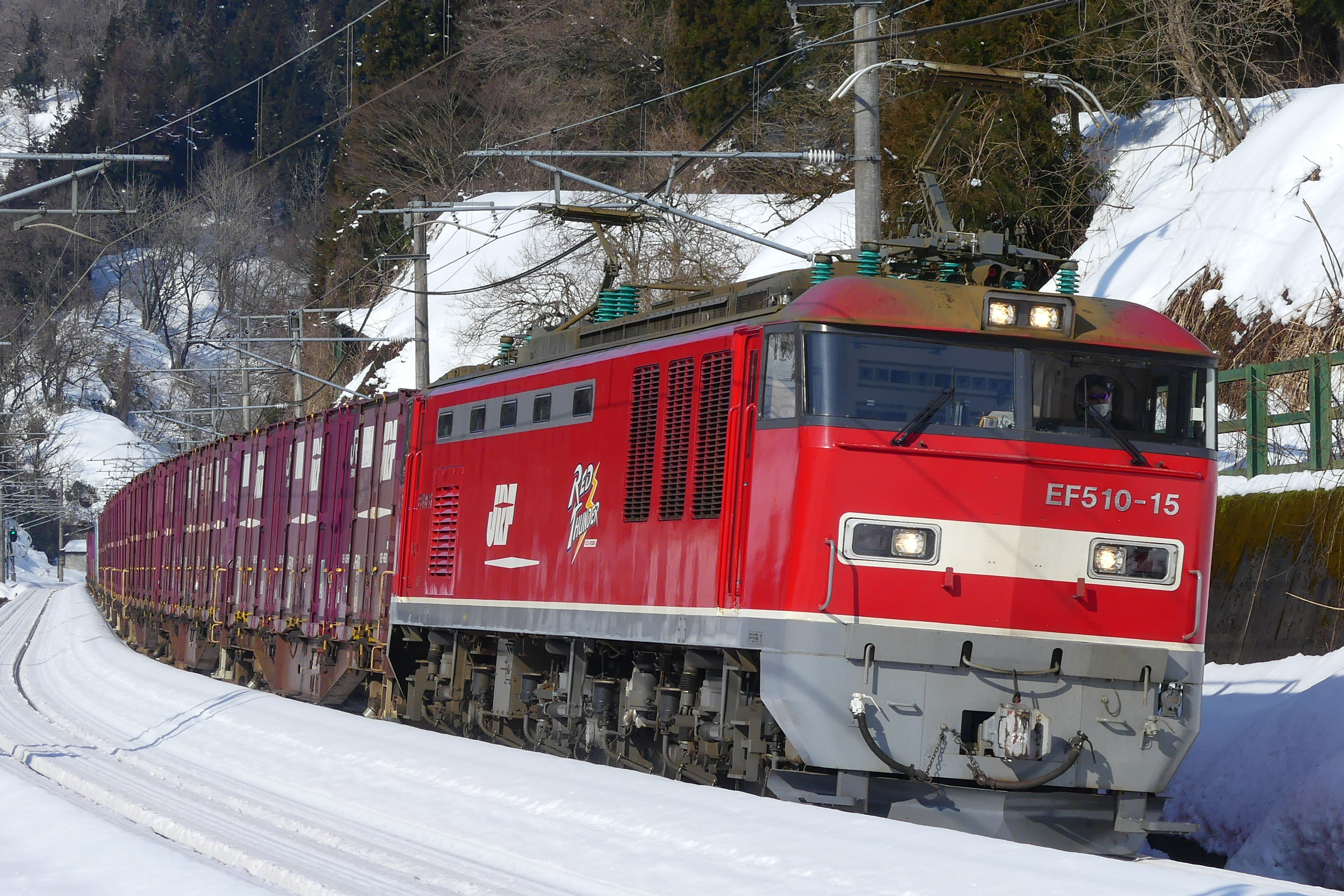
EF510-15, February 2017

== Class EF510-500 ==
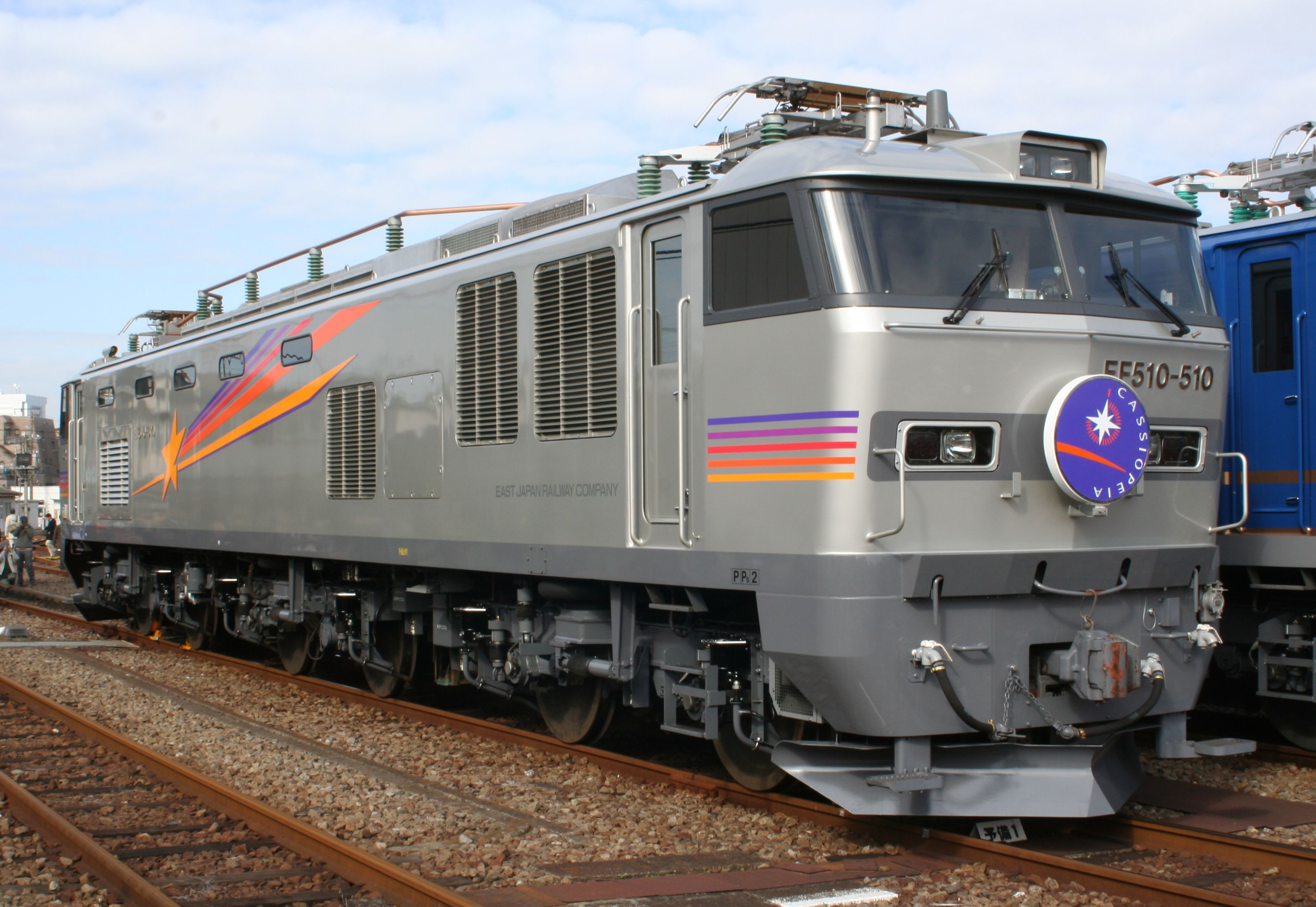
JR East EF510-510 in Cassiopeia livery at Oku Depot open day, November 2010

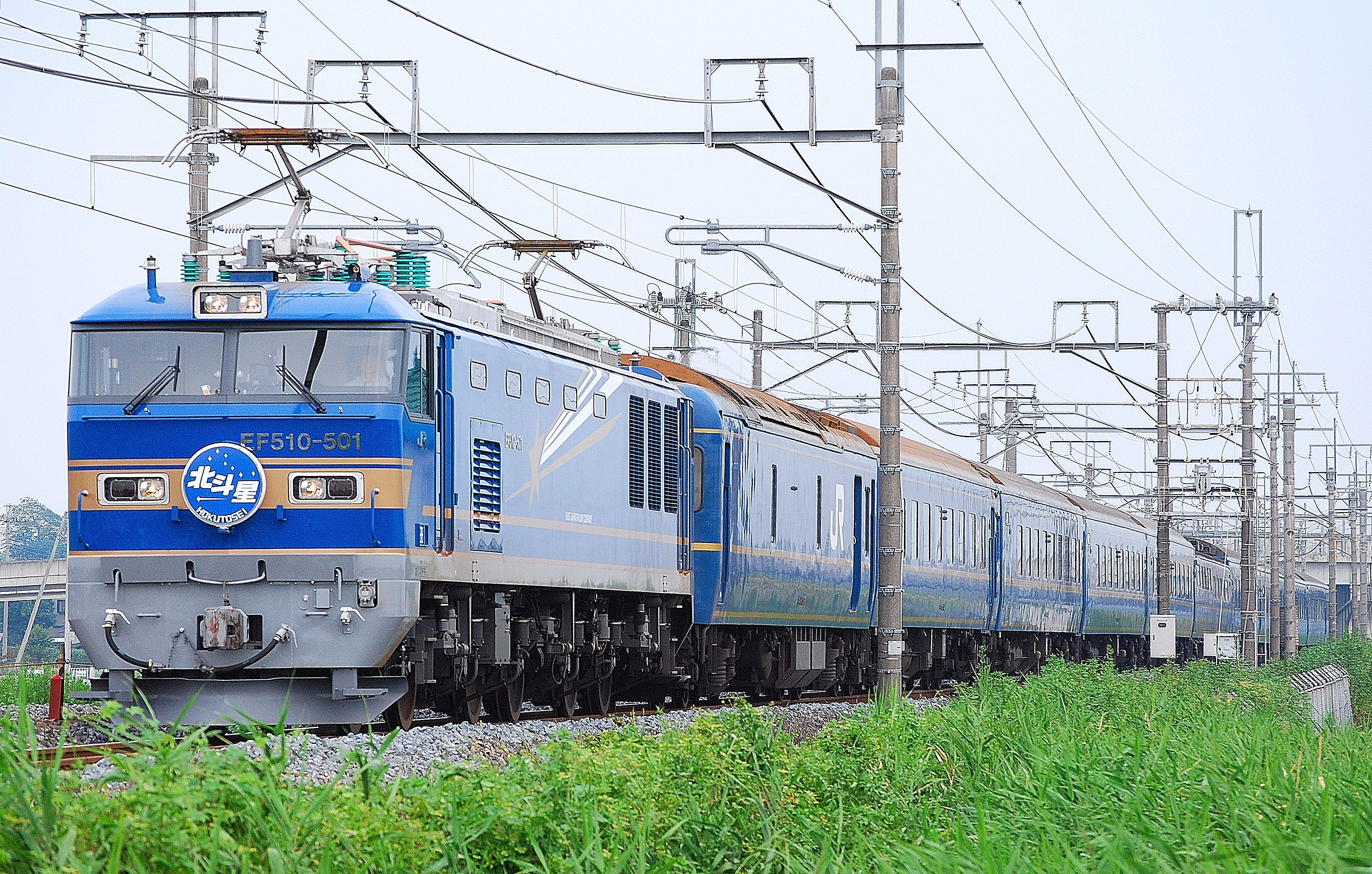
JR East EF510-501 hauling a Hokutosei sleeping car service, September 2010

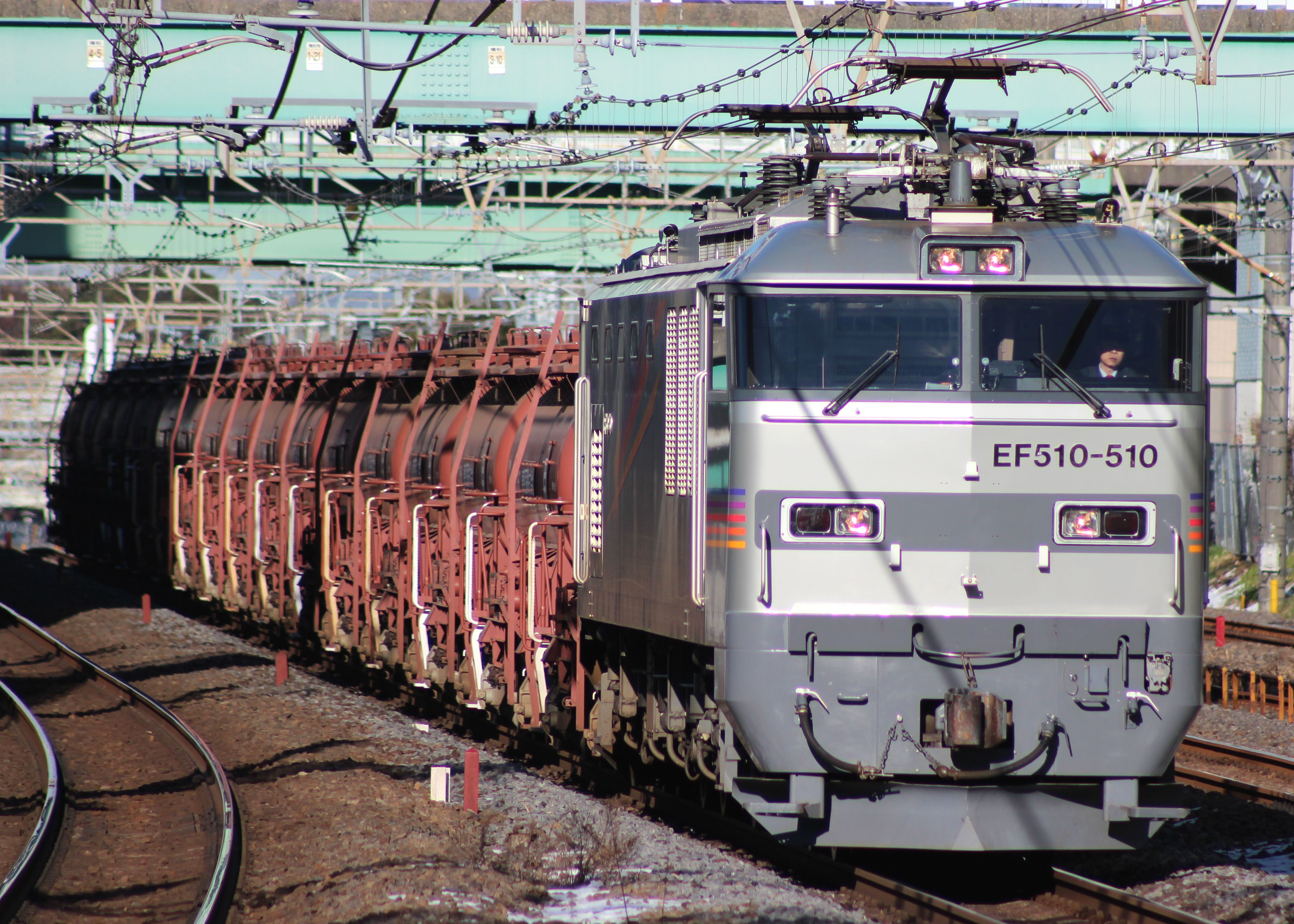
JR East EF510-510 on a Joban Line freight working, January 2013

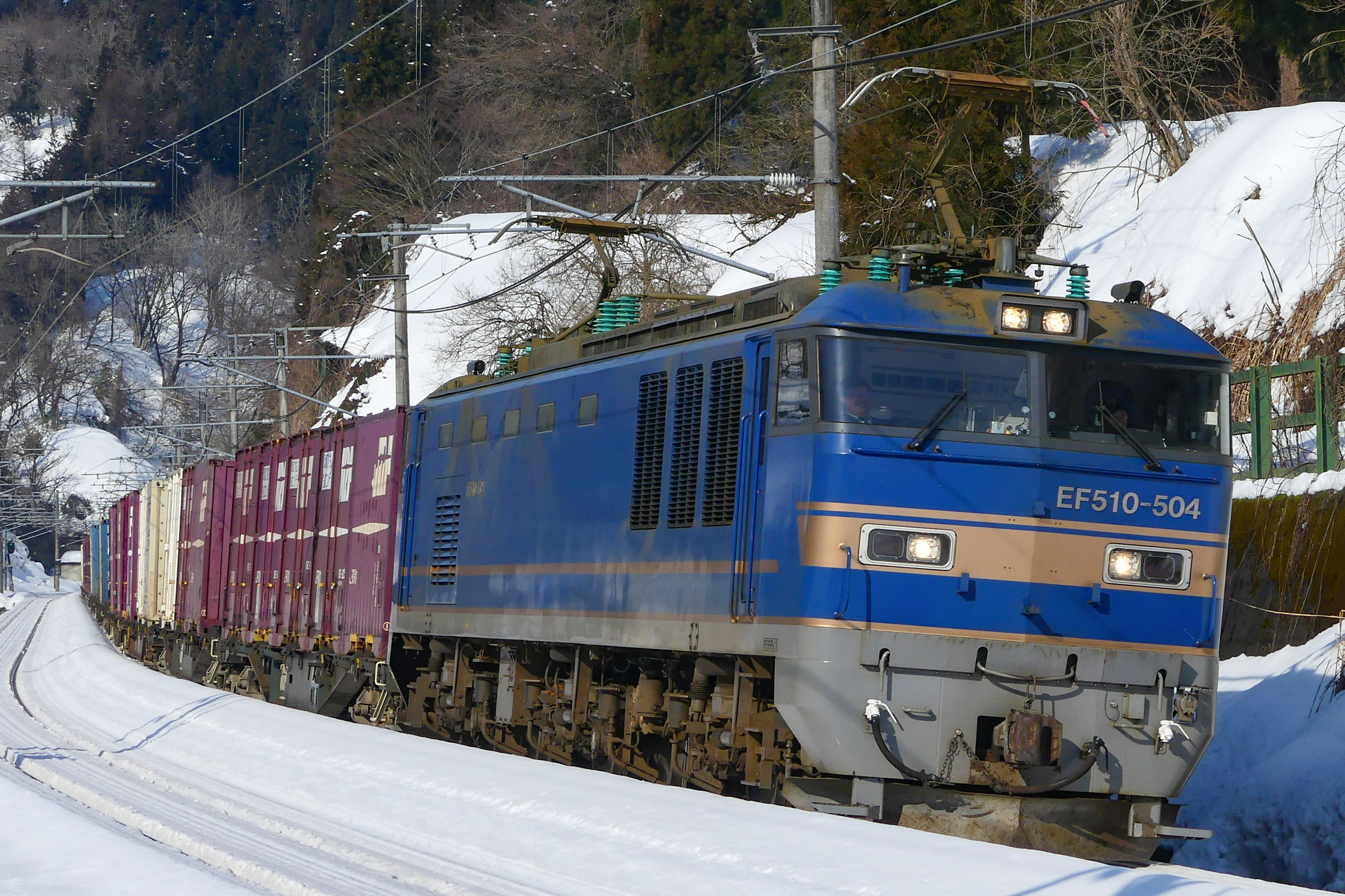
EF510-504 following transfer to JR Freight, February 2017

The EF510-500 subclass consists of 15 locomotives originally operated by East Japan Railway Company (JR East), which replaced its fleet of EF81 locomotives formerly used to haul Cassiopeia and Hokutosei overnight sleeping car trains from June 2010.

These were the first locomotives to be ordered by any of the JR passenger operating companies since privatization. The new locomotives cost around 400 million yen each. The first locomotive, EF510-501, was delivered from the Kawasaki Heavy Industries factory in Hyogo Prefecture on 18 December 2009, arriving at Tabata Depot in Tokyo on 19 December. Livery was blue with gold lining and shooting star logo.

Two of the fifteen locomotives (EF510-509 and EF510-510) were painted in a dedicated colour scheme of silver with blue, purple, red, orange, and yellow stripes, to match the Cassiopeia rolling stock.

The first locomotive, EF510-501, entered service on 25 June 2010.

From the start of the revised timetable in March 2013, Joban Line freight duties operated by JR East EF510-500 locomotives were operated instead by JR Freight Class EH500 locomotives, and locomotive numbers EF510-501 to 508 and 511 became surplus to requirements. These nine locomotives were subsequently sold to JR Freight in July 2013. Locomotives EF510-512, 513, and 515 were also transferred to JR Freight in December 2015.

=== Build details ===
The delivery dates and liveries for the Class EF510-500 fleet are as follows.

| Number | Delivered | Livery | Transfer to JR Freight |
|---|---|---|---|
| EF510-501 | 25 December 2009 | ■ Hokutosei blue | July 2013 |
| EF510-502 | 26 January 2010 | ■ Hokutosei blue | July 2013 |
| EF510-503 | 20 April 2010 | ■ Hokutosei blue | July 2013 |
| EF510-504 | 7 May 2010 | ■ Hokutosei blue | July 2013 |
| EF510-505 | 19 May 2010 | ■ Hokutosei blue | July 2013 |
| EF510-506 | 2 June 2010 | ■ Hokutosei blue | July 2013 |
| EF510-507 | 15 June 2010 | ■ Hokutosei blue | July 2013 |
| EF510-508 | 25 June 2010 | ■ Hokutosei blue | July 2013 |
| EF510-509 | 9 July 2010 | ■ Cassiopeia silver | March 2016 |
| EF510-510 | 22 July 2010 | ■ Cassiopeia silver | March 2016 |
| EF510-511 | 6 August 2010 | ■ Hokutosei blue | July 2013 |
| EF510-512 | 27 August 2010 | ■ Hokutosei blue | December 2015 |
| EF510-513 | 10 September 2010 | ■ Hokutosei blue | December 2015 |
| EF510-514 | 20 October 2010 | ■ Hokutosei blue | February 2016 |
| EF510-515 | 8 October 2010 | ■ Hokutosei blue | December 2015 |
| EF510-516 | 7 November 2010 | ■ Hokutosei blue | February 2016 |

== Class EF510-300 ==
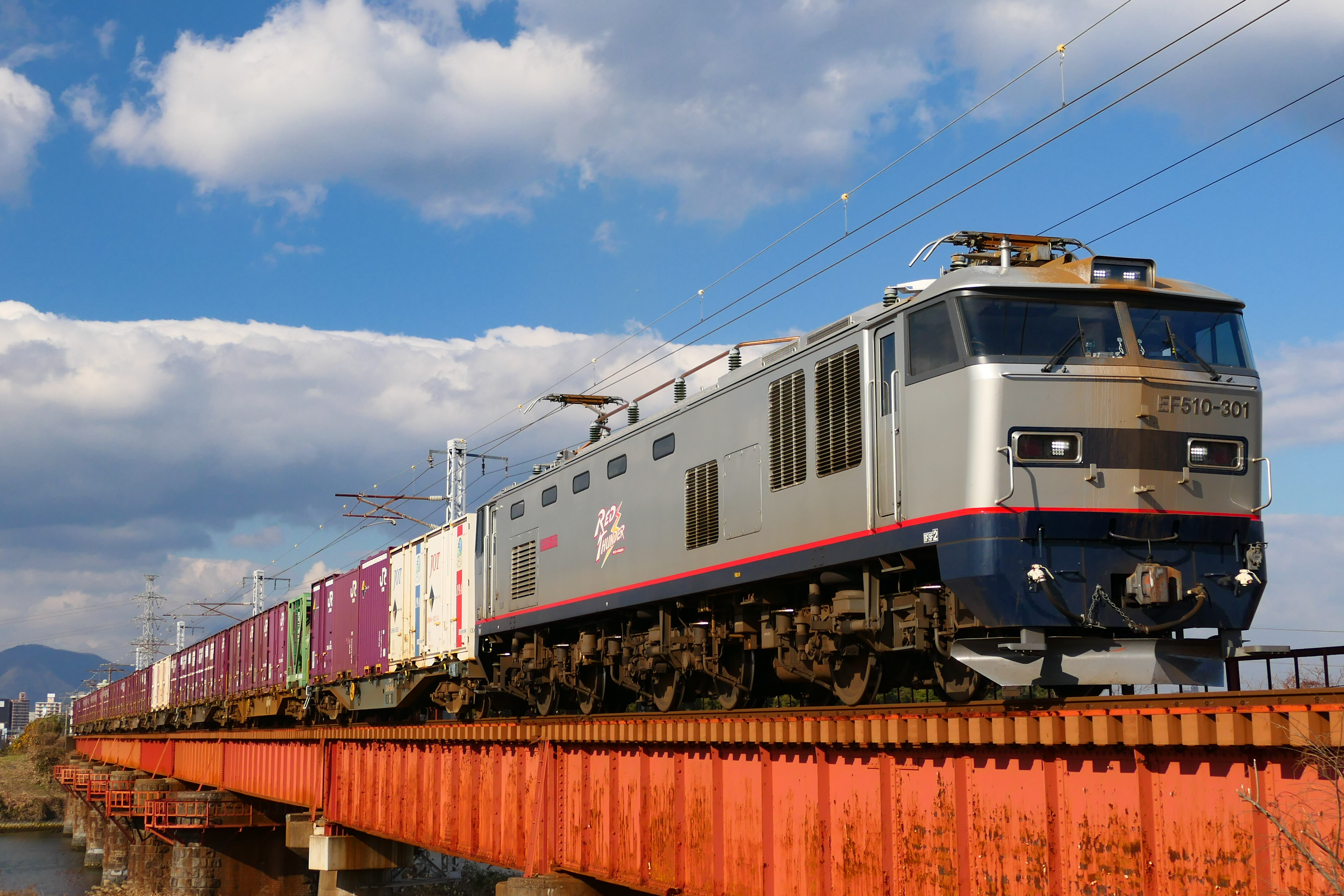
EF510-301 in January 2024

The EF510-300 subclass is operated by JR Freight in the Kyushu area of Japan, of which 17 locomotives were ordered. Originally intended to enter service in March 2023, they entered service on 25 February of that year.

As part of its business plan for fiscal 2021, JR Freight announced on 31 March 2021 that it would procure Class EF510 locomotives to replace ageing locomotives used in the Kyushu region, such as the Class ED76 and Class EF81. On 15 October of that year, JR Kyushu revealed that the subclass would receive the nickname "ECO-POWER Red Thunder" (「ECO-POWER レッドサンダー」) and that the first production example of the subclass (EF510-301) was completed. EF510-301 was unveiled to the press on 9 December 2021.

== Classification ==
The EF510 classification for this locomotive type is explained below.

- E: Electric locomotive
- F: Six driving axles
- 510: AC/DC locomotive with AC motors
