= Akebono (train) =

Overnight train service in Japan

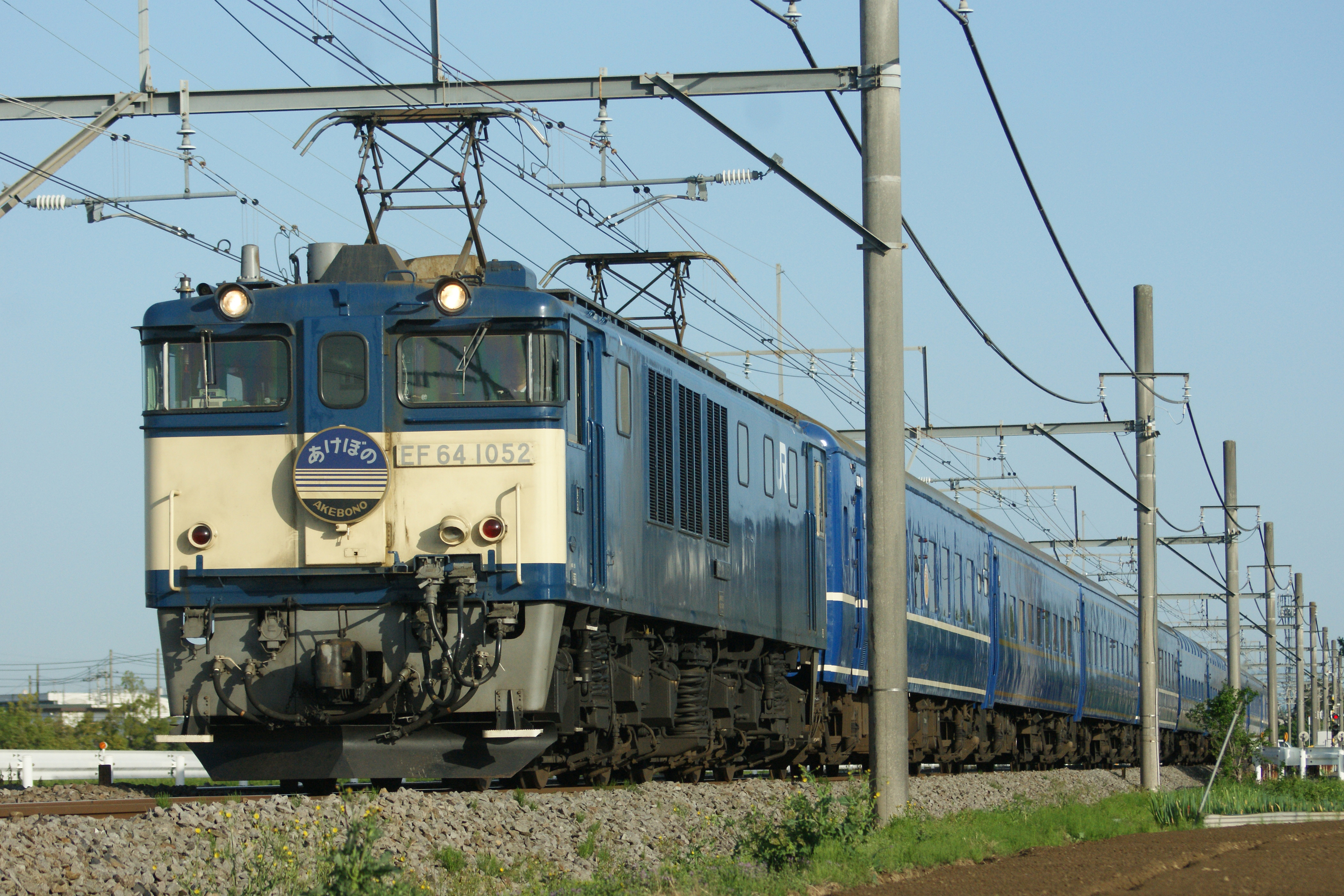
- An Akebono service hauled by an EF64-1000 locomotive in May 2010

Overview
- Service type: Limited express
- Status: Discontinued
- Locale: Honshu, Japan
- First service: 15 July 1962 (Express); 1 July 1970 (Limited express)
- Last service: 4 January 2015
- Current operator: JR East
- Former operator: JNR

Route
- Termini: Ueno; Aomori
- Average journey time: 12 hours
- Service frequency: 1 return working daily (seasonal)
- Lines used: Takasaki Line, Joetsu Line, Uetsu Main Line, Ou Main Line

Technical
- Rolling stock: 24 series sleeper coaches
- Track gauge: 1,067 mm (3 ft 6 in)
- Electrification: 1,500 V DC / 20 kV AC (50 Hz)
- Operating speed: 110 km/h (70 mph)

The Akebono (あけぼの) was a seasonal limited express sleeper train service operated by East Japan Railway Company (JR East), which ran from Ueno Station in Tokyo to Aomori, via the Joetsu Line, Uetsu Main Line and Ou Main Line. The journey took approximately 12 hours.

== Service outline ==
During busy holiday seasons, one Akebono service operates in each direction daily between Ueno in Tokyo and Aomori, stopping at the following main stations. Prior to 15 March 2014, the train ran daily all year round. While JR East has not formally announced its discontinuation, no services have operated since January 2015.

- Ueno
- Omiya
- Takasaki
- Murakami
- Tsuruoka
- Sakata
- Akita
- Hirosaki
- Aomori

== Rolling stock ==
The train is formed of 24 series sleeping cars based at JR East's Aomori Depot, typically consisting of 13 cars including a KaNi24 generator car at the Aomori end. The train is hauled by a JR East Nagaoka-based EF64-1000 DC electric locomotive between Ueno and Nagaoka, and by an EF81 between Nagaoka and Aomori.

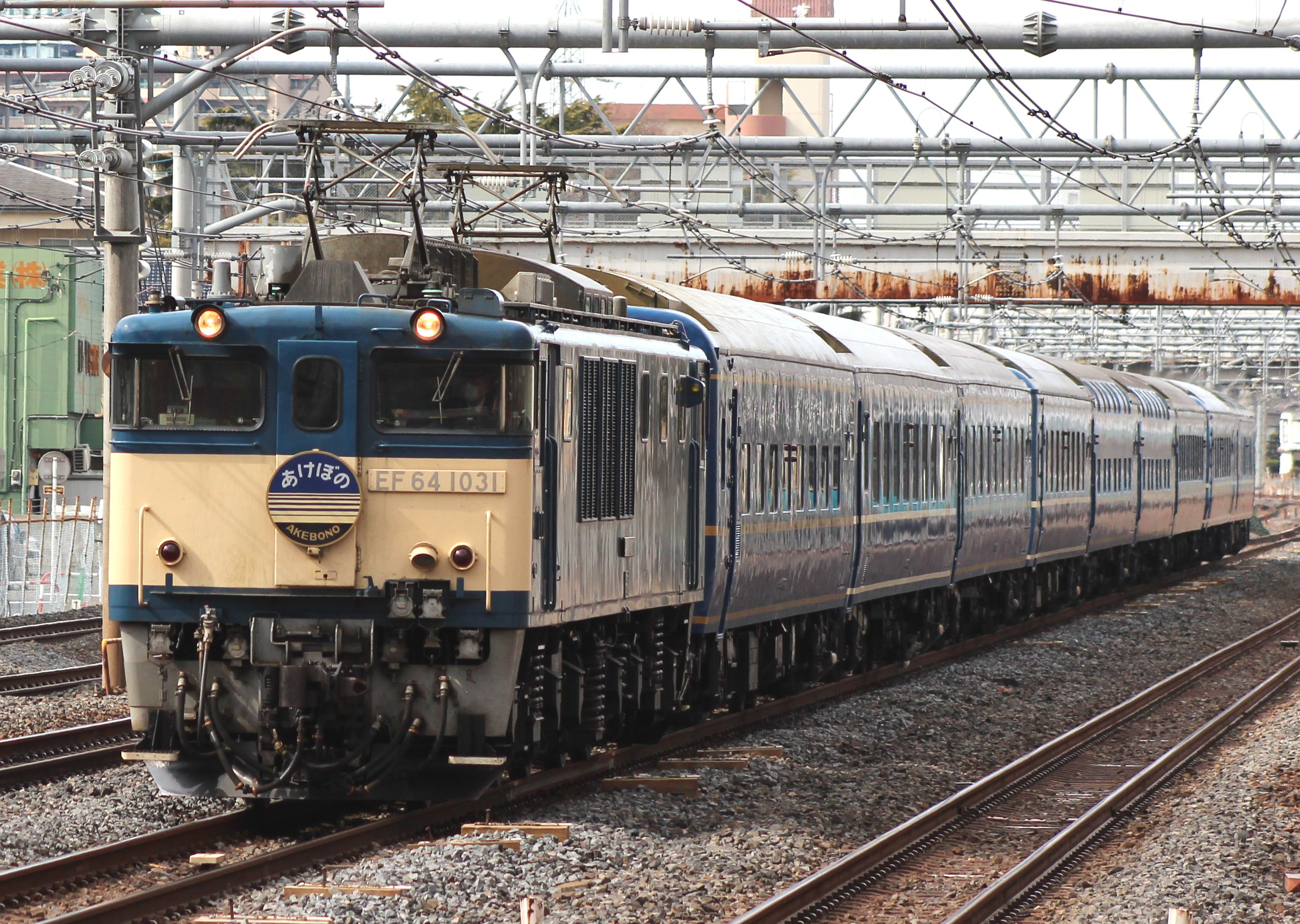
An Akebono service hauled by a Class EF64-1000 locomotive in March 2013

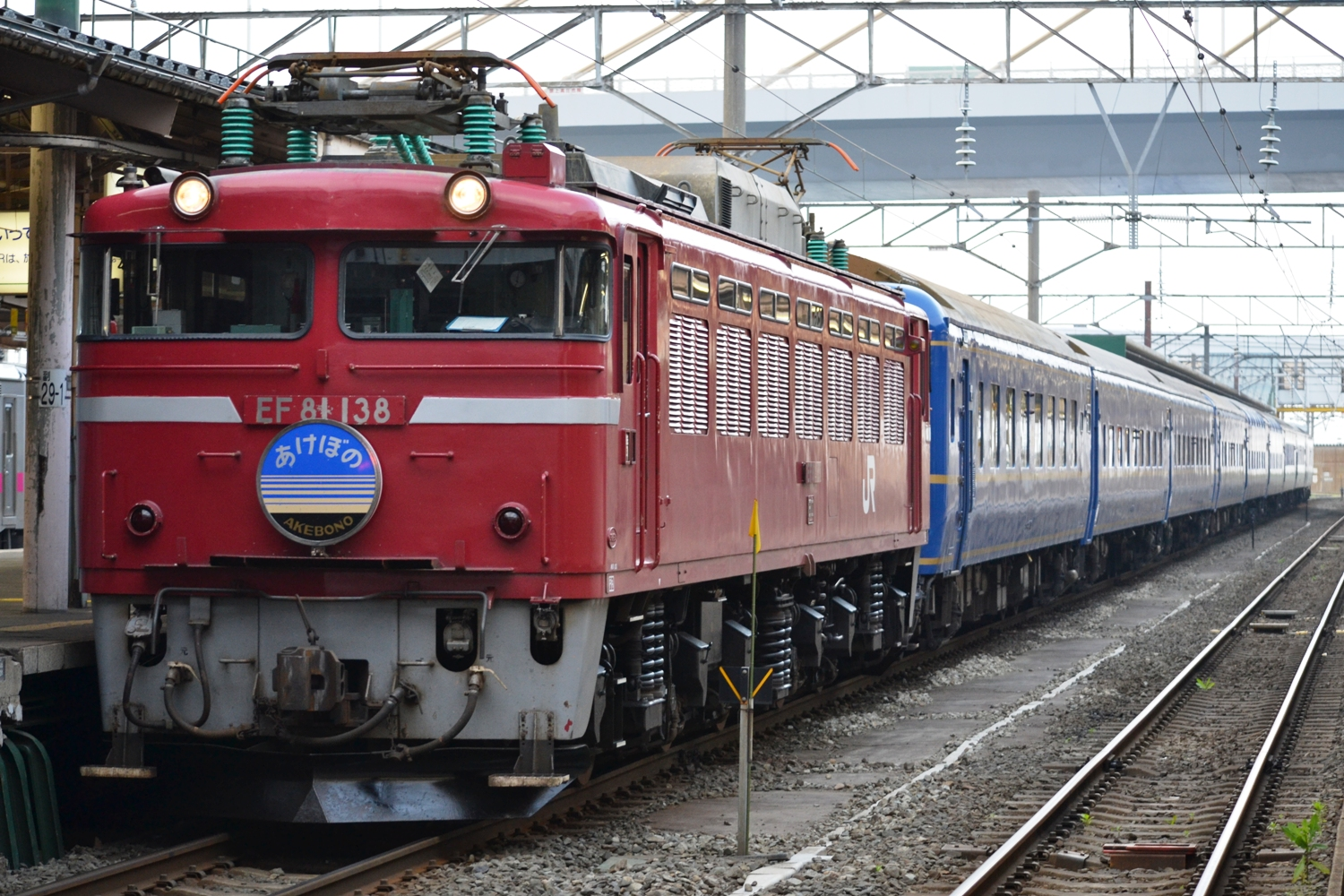
An Akebono service hauled by a Class EF81 locomotive in June 2011

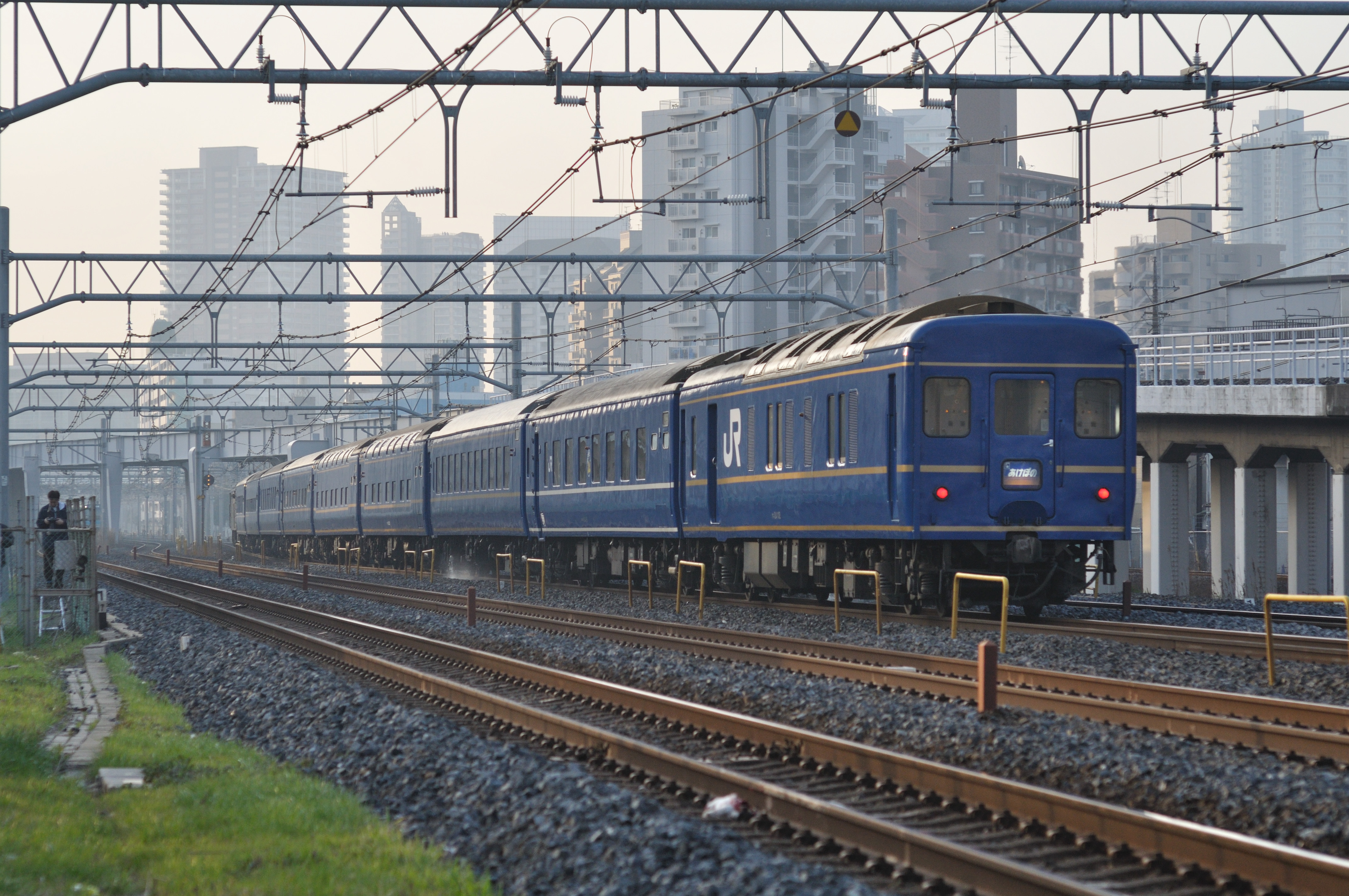
An Akebono service heading toward Ueno in March 2010

=== Formation ===
Since the 15 March 2008 timetable revision, Akebono services are normally formed as shown below, with car 1 at the Ueno (Tokyo) end.

Car No.	1	2	3	4	5	6	7	8	
Type	OHaNeFu 25	OHaNe 24	OHaNe 25	OHaNeFu 25	OHaNe 24-550	OHaNe 24-550	SuRoNe 24-550	OHaNeFu 25	KaNi24

- Car 1 includes women-only couchettes and Goronto Seat couchettes without bedding.
- The KaNi 24 is a generator car.

=== Rolling stock timeline ===
The changes in rolling stock and locomotive haulage over the years are as shown below.

==== Coaches ====
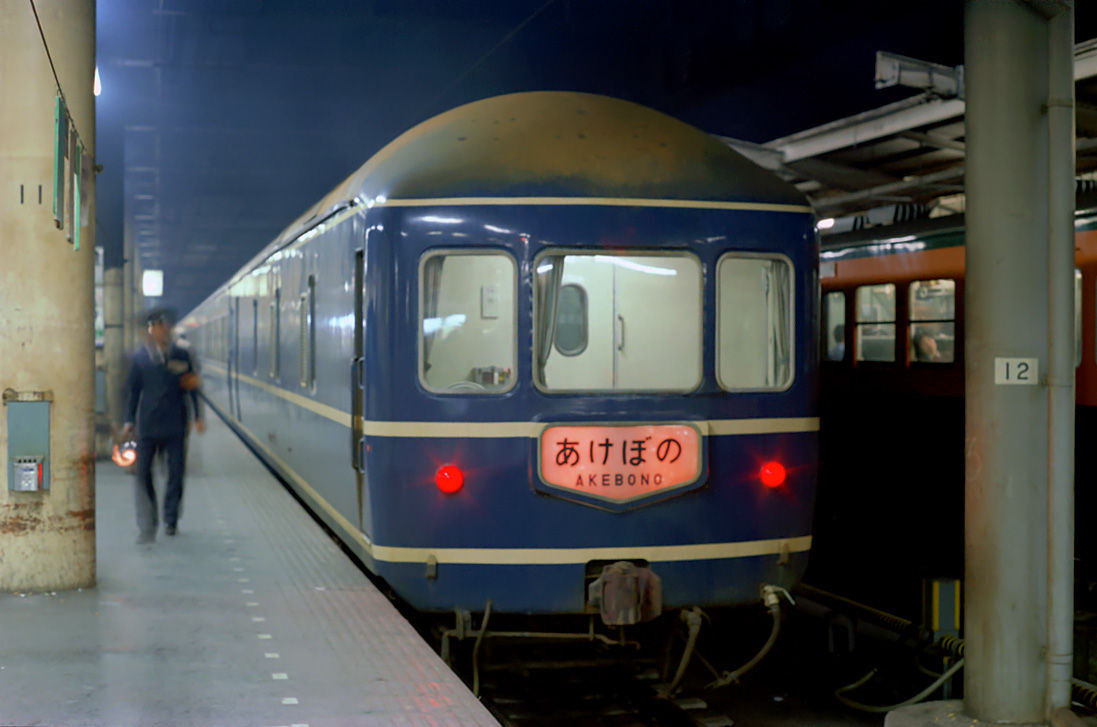
A 20 series generator van at the rear of an Akebono service in 1976

Period	Coaches
1 July 1970 - 1 October 1980	20 series
1 October 1980 – 2015	24 series

==== Locomotive haulage ====
Period	Locomotive type
1 July 1970 - 25 November 1975	EF65-1000; ED75; EF71 + ED78; DD51
25 November 1975 - 1 September 1990	EF65-1000; ED75; EF71 + ED78; ED75-700
1 September 1990 - 1 December 1993	EF65-1000; ED75; DE10; ED75-700
1 December 1993 - 22 March 1997	EF81; DE10; ED75-700
22 March 1997 - 14 March 2009	EF81
14 March 2009 – Present	EF64; EF81

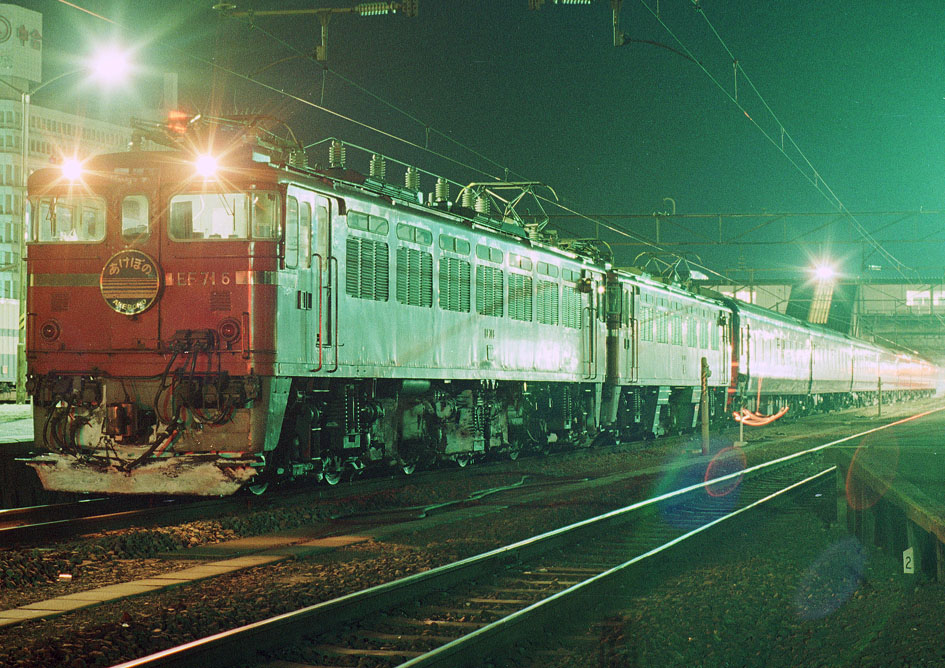
An Akebono service hauled by Class EF71 and ED78 AC electric locomotives around 1987

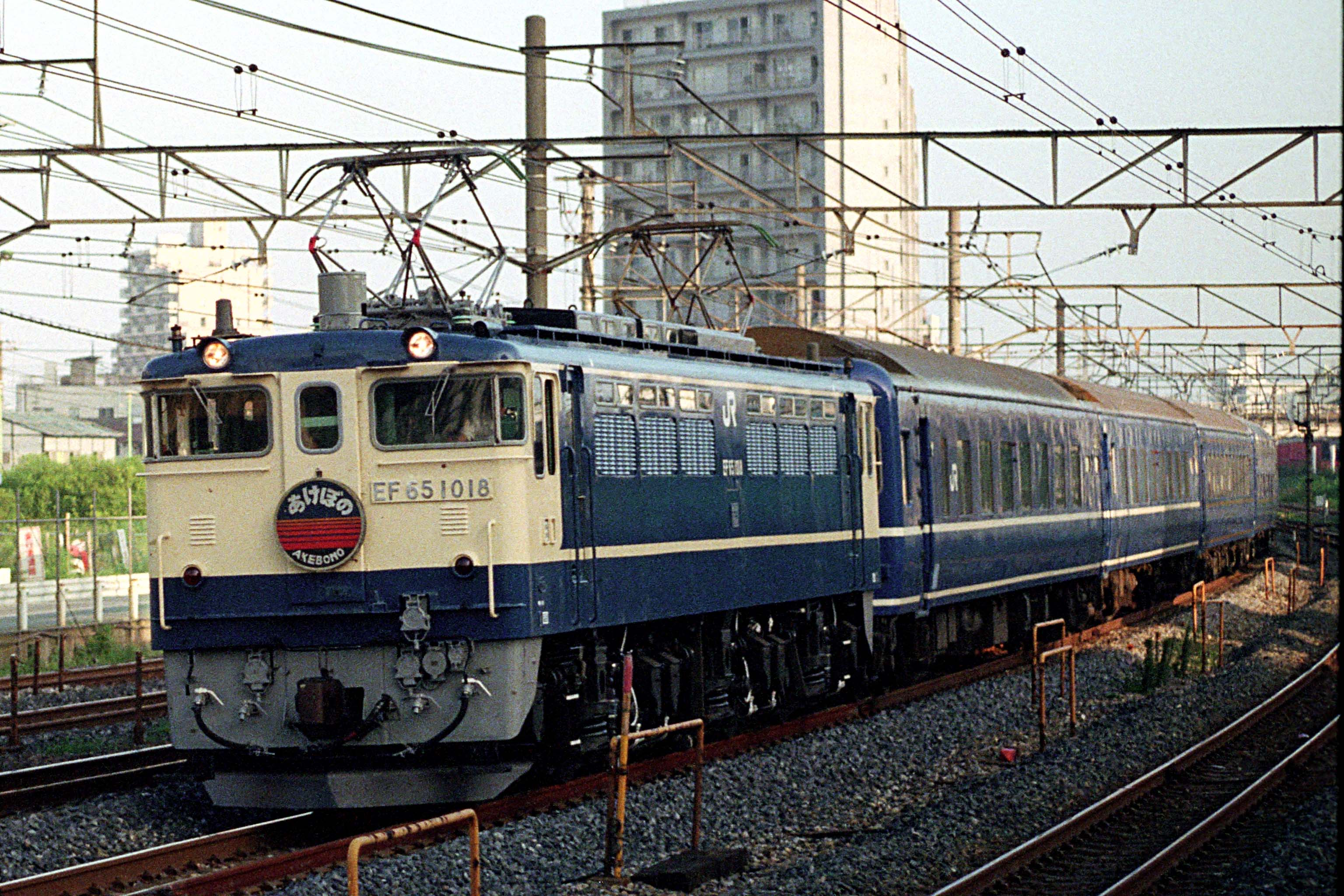
An Akebono service hauled by a Class EF65-1000 DC electric locomotive in 1991

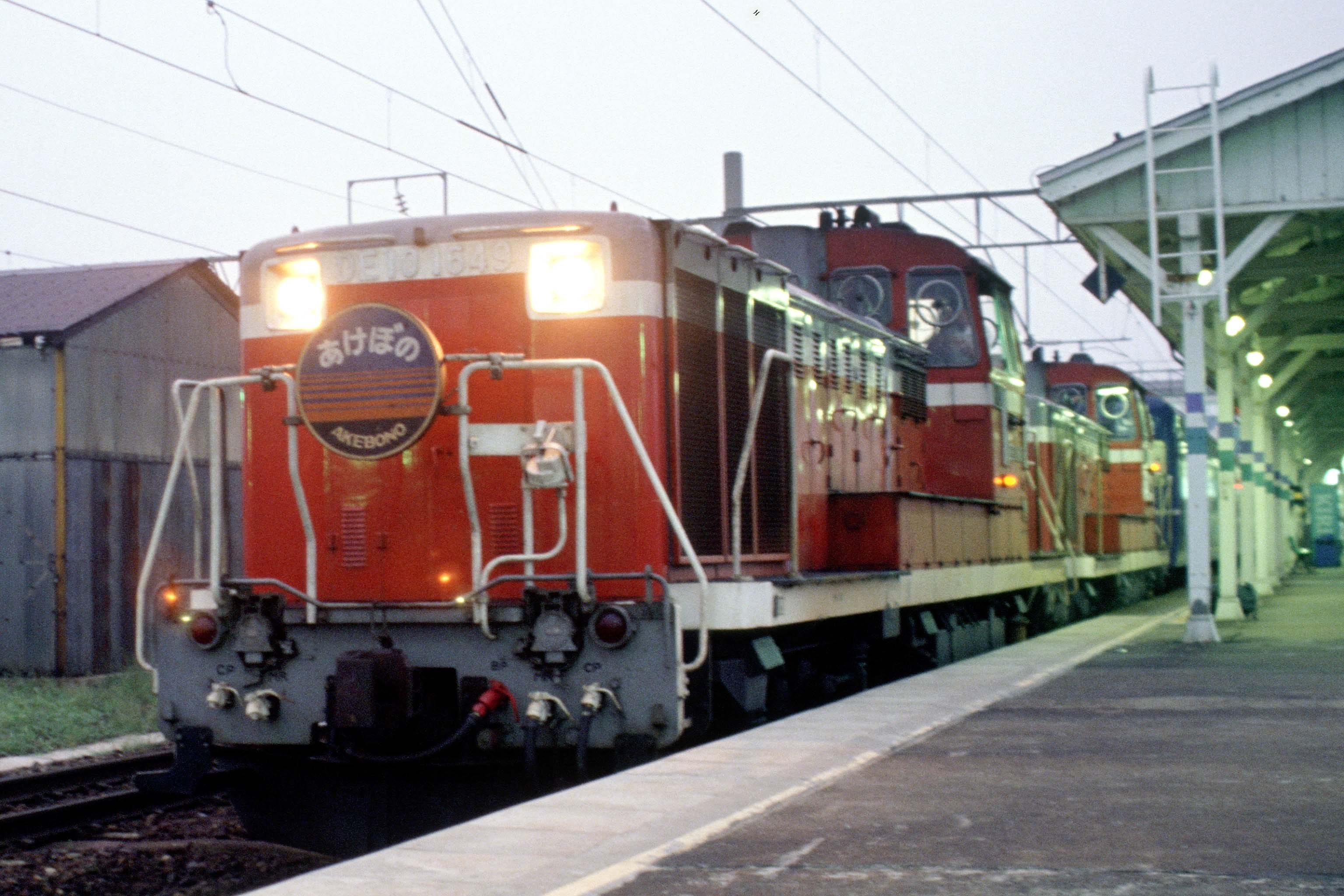
A pair of Class DE10 diesel locomotives on an Akebono service in August 1992

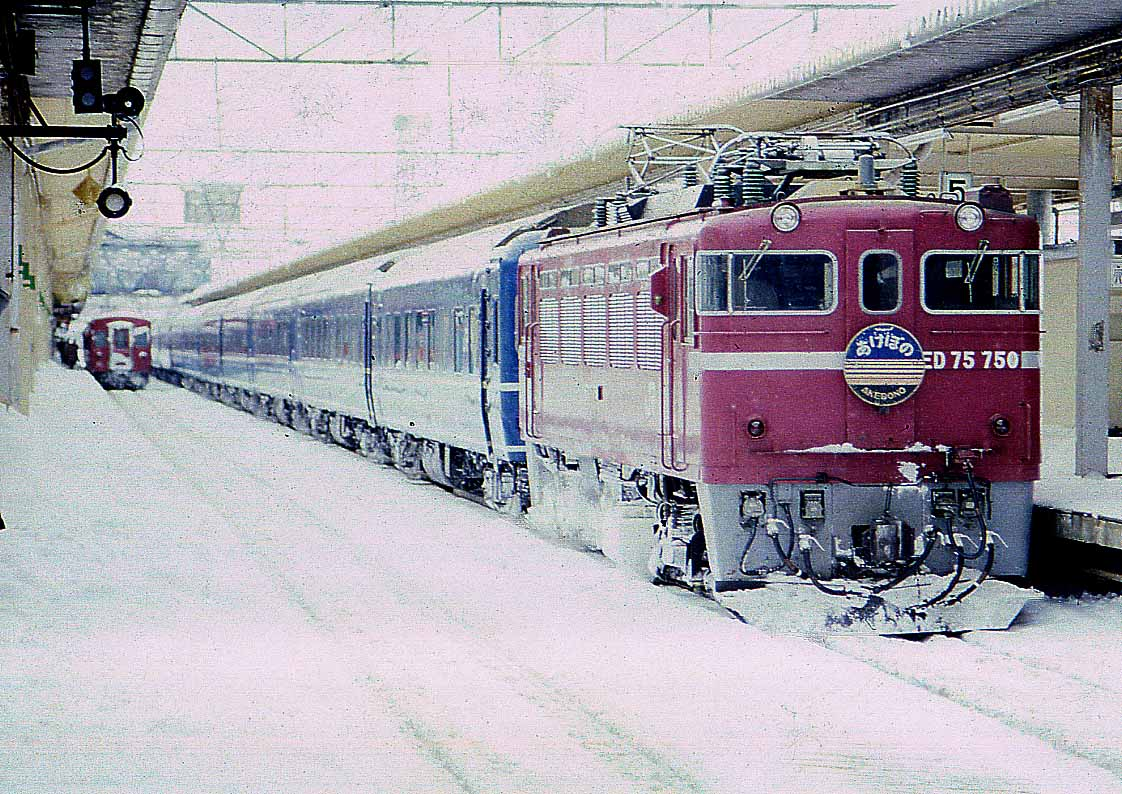
An Akebono service hauled by a Class ED75-700 AC electric locomotive in March 2010

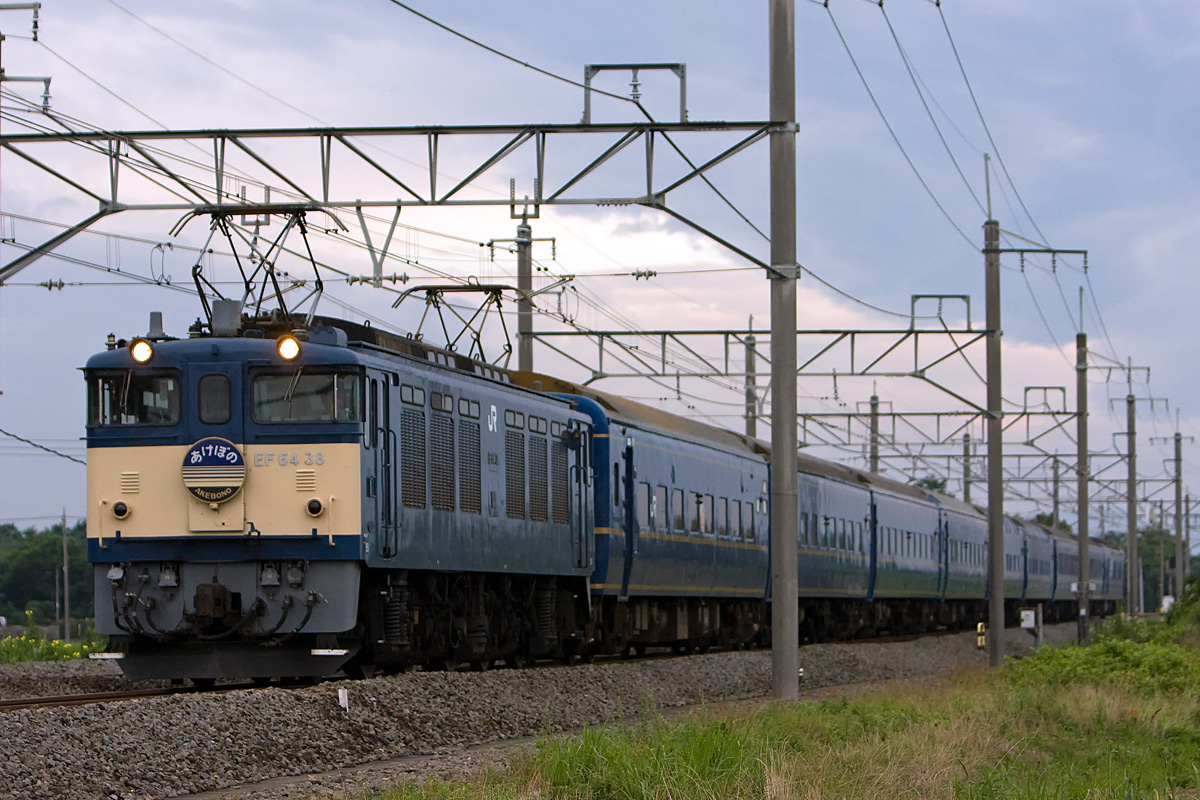
An Akebono service hauled by a Class EF64-0 DC electric locomotive in 2009

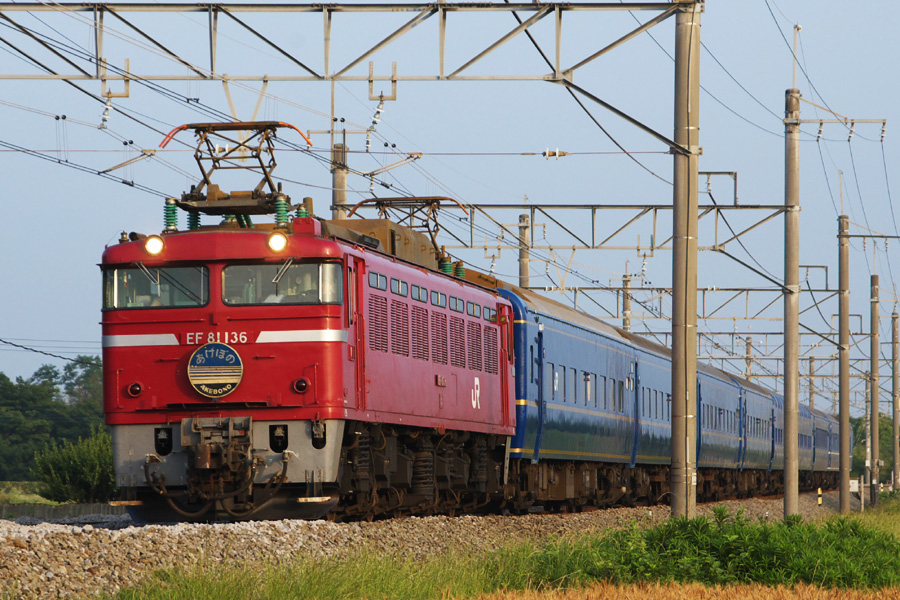
Akebono service hauled by a Class EF81 locomotive in June 2007

== Interior ==
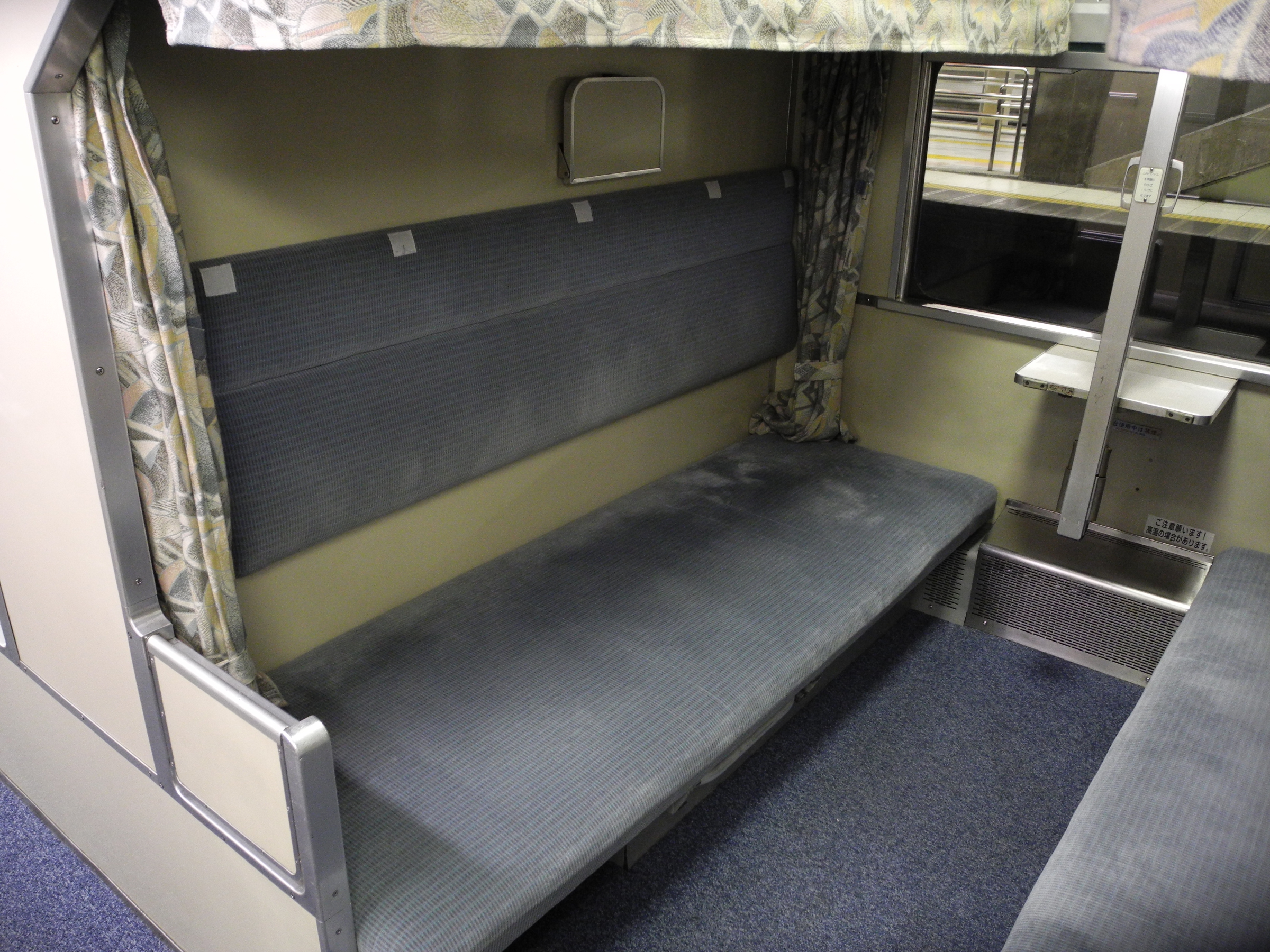
4-person couchette (lower berth)

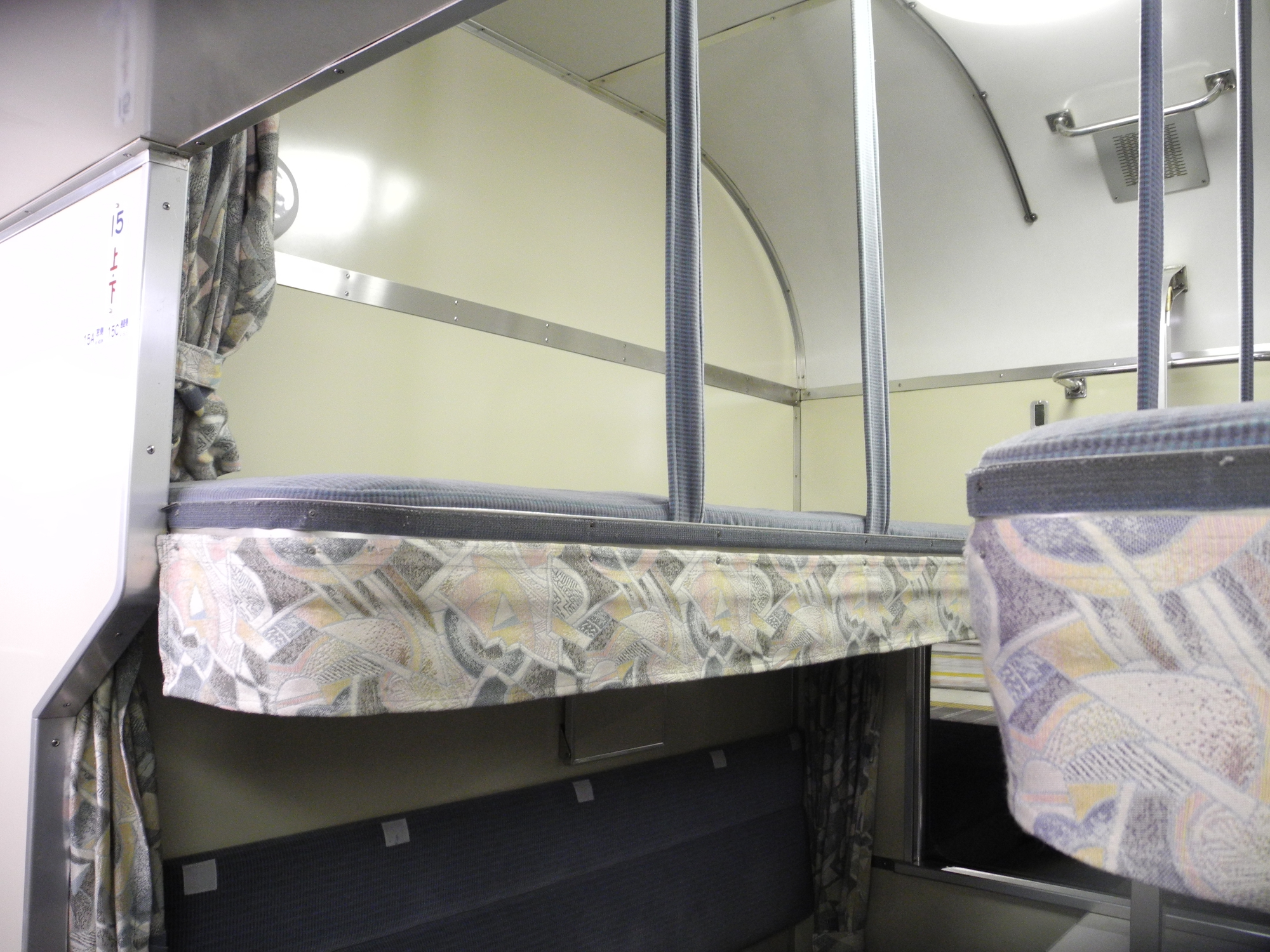
4-person couchette (upper berth)

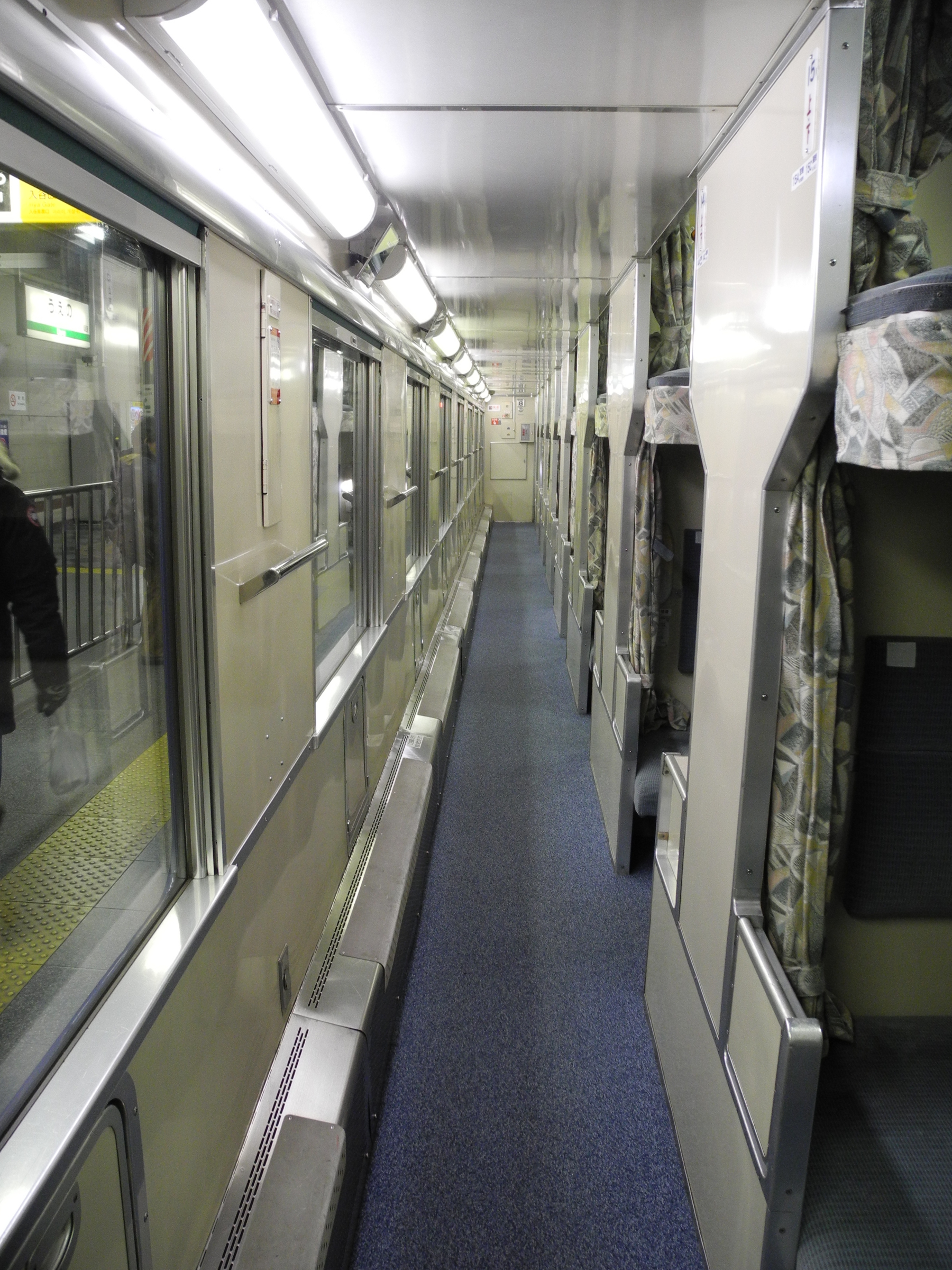
Corridor

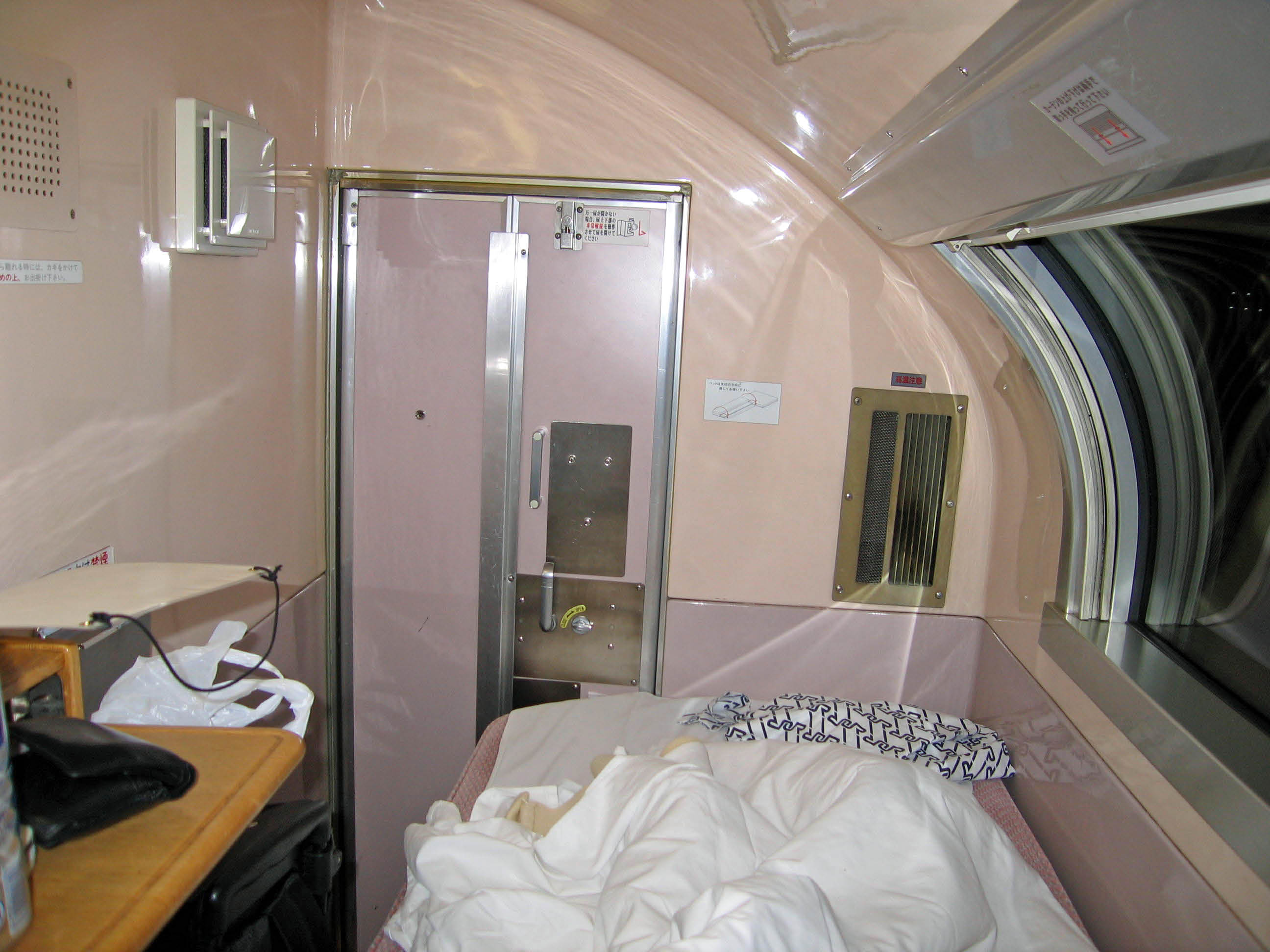
A "Solo" single-berth compartment

== History ==
=== Sendai - Aomori express (1962 - 1968) ===
The Akebono was introduced on 15 July 1962, as an express service running between Sendai and Aomori via Akita. The train operated using a three-car KiHa 58 series DMU formation, consisting of KiHa 58 + KiRo 28 + KiHa 58. The down service departed from Sendai Station at 13:50, arriving at Akita at 18:35, and reaching Aomori at 21:56. The up working departed from Aomori at 06:25, departing from Akita at 09:50, arriving at Sendai at 14:30.

From April 1963, between Akita and Aomori, the train ran coupled with the two-car Shirayuki (しらゆき) express service, which ran between Kanazawa and Aomori along the Sea of Japan coast.

From the start of the 1 October 1968 timetable revision, the train was renamed Kitakami (きたかみ).

=== Ueno - Aomori limited express (1970 - ) ===
The name Akebono was revived from 1 July 1970 for a new overnight sleeping car service initially operating as a seasonal service between Ueno in Tokyo and Akita via Fukushima and the Uetsu Main Line using newly delivered 20 series sleeping cars. From 1 October 1970, the train became a daily scheduled train, and was extended to run between Ueno and Aomori. The down service departed from Ueno Station at 22:05, arriving at Akita at 07:20 the following morning, and reaching Aomori at 10:39. The up working departed from Aomori at 18:05, departing from Akita at 21:25, arriving at Ueno at 06:50 the following morning.

From the start of the revised timetable in October 1973, a second daily return Akebono working was added, running between Ueno and Akita. From 1 October 1980, the original 20 series sleeping cars were replaced by 24 series sleeping cars.

From the start of the revised timetable in November 1982, a third daily return Akebono working was added. However, with increasing competition from daytime train services and air services, services were cut back to two return workings daily between Ueno and Aomori from March 1988.

From September 1990, with re-gauging work starting on the Ou Main Line between Fukushima and Shinjo in preparation for the new Yamagata Shinkansen, one return Akebono working was renamed Torikai (鳥海) and re-routed via the Joetsu Line and Uetsu Main Line. The remaining Akebono working was re-routed to run via the Rikuu East Line between Fukushima and Shinjo, requiring haulage by pairs of JNR Class DE10 diesel locomotives.

From 22 March 1997, the train was again re-routed, this time running via the Joetsu Line from Ueno to Nagaoka, and then via the Uetsu Main Line to Akita and the Ou Main Line to Aomori.

From the start of the revised timetable on 15 March 2014, regular Akebono services were discontinued, but services still operate during busy seasons.

== See also ==
- Blue Train (Japan)
