= JNR Class ED79 =

Japanese electric locomotive type

Class ED79
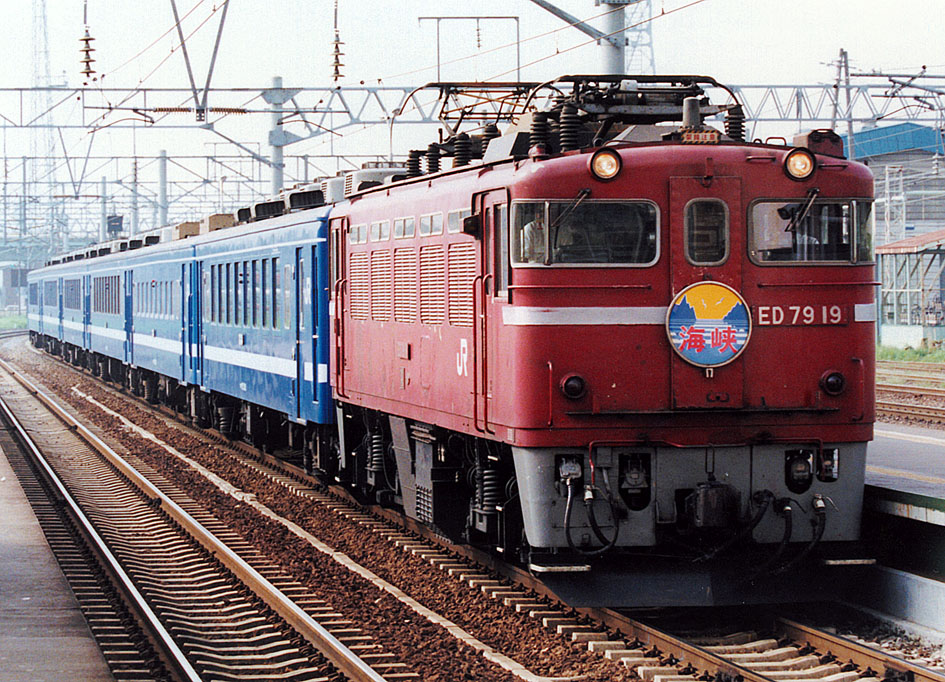
- JR Hokkaido ED79 19 on a Kaikyo service in 1992
Type and origin
- Power type: Electric
- Builder: Hitachi, Mitsubishi, Toshiba
- Build date: 1986–1990
- Total produced: 44
Specifications
- Configuration
  - UIC: Bo-Bo
- Gauge: 1,067 mm (3 ft 6 in)
- Bogies: DT129
- Wheel diameter: 1,120 mm (44.09 in)
- Length: 14,300 mm (46 ft 11 in)
- Width: 2,800 mm (9 ft 2 1/4 in) (ED79-0/100); 2,800 mm (9 ft 2 1/4 in) (ED79-50)
- Loco weight: 68.0 t (66.9 long tons; 75.0 short tons) (ED79-0/100); 67.8 t (66.7 long tons; 74.7 short tons) (ED79-50)
- Electric system/s: 20 kV AC at 50 Hz overhead wire
- Current pickup: Pantograph
- Traction motors: MT52C x 4
- MU working: Within Class Only
- Loco brake: Air and Electrical regenerative
- Train brakes: Air
- Safety systems: ATC ATS-SF
Performance figures
- Maximum speed: 110 km/h (70 mph)
- Power output: 1,900 kW (2,500 hp)
Career
- Operators: JR Freight, JR Hokkaido
- Number in class: 0
- Delivered: 1986
- Preserved: 0
- Disposition: All withdrawn and scrapped

The Class ED79 (ED79形) was a Bo-Bo wheel arrangement AC electric locomotive type operated on passenger and freight services in the north of Japan from 1986, originally by Japanese National Railways (JNR), and later by Hokkaido Railway Company (JR Hokkaido) and Japan Freight Railway Company (JR Freight) until 2016.

== Variants ==
- ED79-0: Numbers ED79-1 – 21 (converted from ED75-700, 1986-1987)
- ED79-50: Numbers ED79-51 – 60 (built from new)
- ED79-100: Number ED79-101 – 113 (converted from ED75-700, 1986-1987)

== ED79-0 ==
21 Class ED79-0 locomotives were converted between 1986 and 1987 at JNR's Omiya, Tsuchizaki, and Naebo Workshops from former Class ED75-700 locomotives to haul both freight and passenger trains through the undersea Seikan Tunnel between the main island of Honshu and the northern island of Hokkaido, which opened in March 1988. The gear ratio was reduced from the 4.44 of the original ED75 locomotives to 3.38, giving a top speed of 110 km/h (70 mph) better suited to express passenger and freight workings. With the privatization of JNR on 1 April 1987, all 21 locomotives were transferred to the ownership of JR Hokkaido.

Daytime Kaikyo services previously hauled by Class ED79 locomotives between Aomori and Hakodate through the Seikan Tunnel were discontinued in 2002, replaced by the Hakucho and Super Hakucho limited express services using electric multiple unit (EMU) trains). In 2006, the Nihonkai sleeping car service no longer ran through the tunnel, and JR Freight also ceased using JR Hokkaido locomotives on freight services, due to the increased availability of Class EH500 locomotives.

By 1 April 2013, nine Class ED79-0 locomotives remained in service, owned by JR Hokkaido and based at Hakodate Depot. These were used to haul the Cassiopeia, Hokutosei, Twilight Express, and Hamanasu overnight services between Aomori and Hakodate via the Seikan Tunnel. All remaining locomotives had been withdrawn by March 2016.

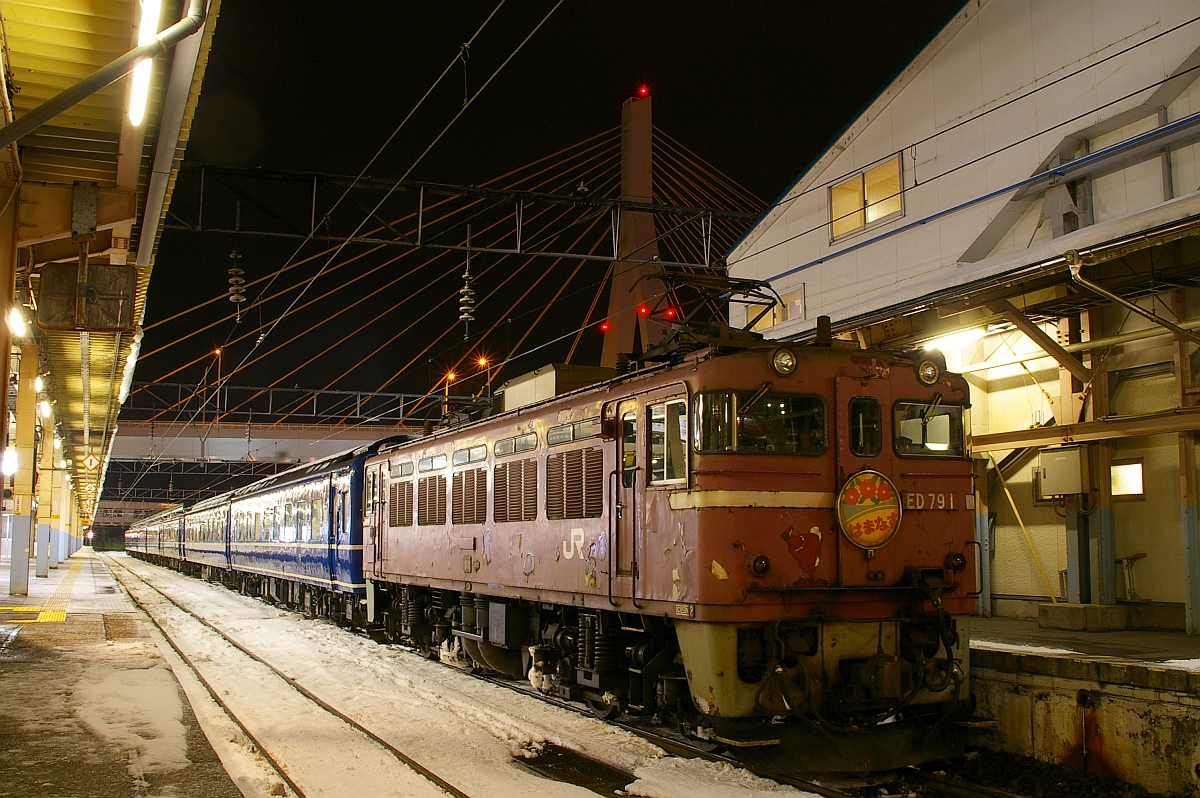
ED79 1 on a Hamanasu service, January 2005

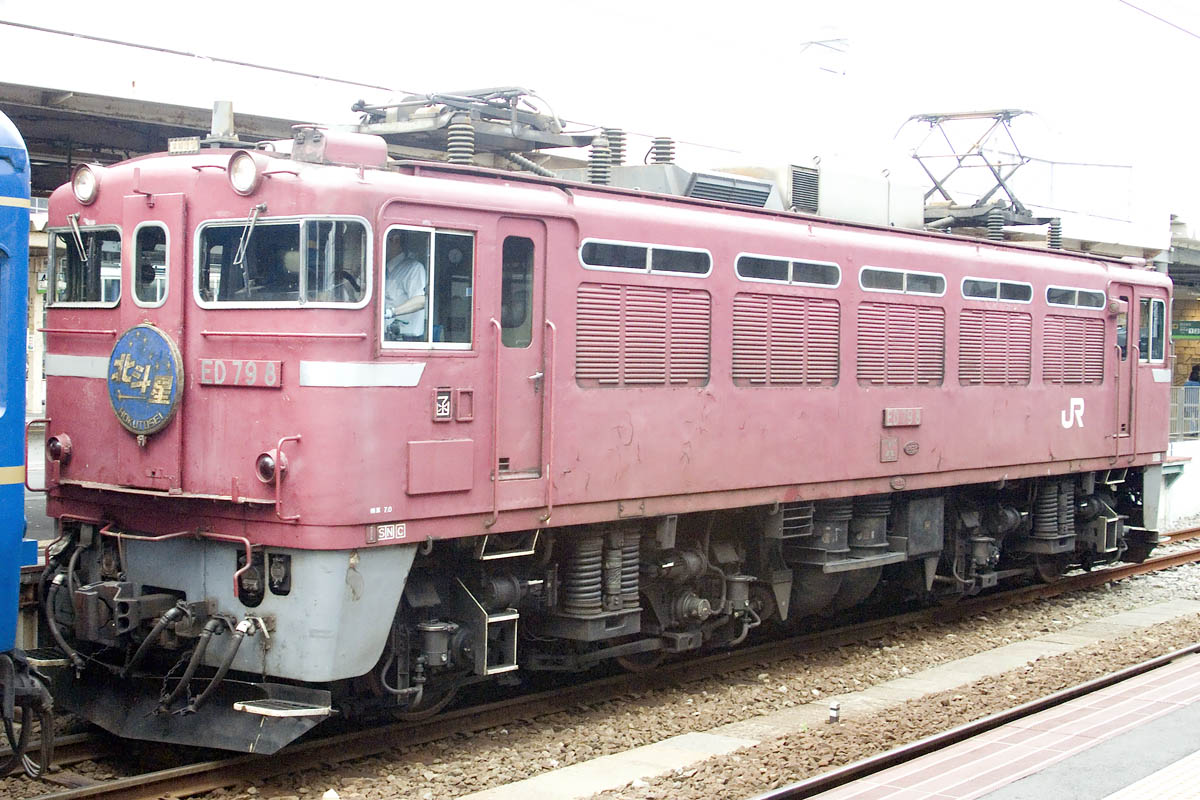
ED79 8 at Hakodate Station after arriving on a Hokutosei overnight sleeping car service, July 2004

The fleet details are shown below.

Number	Converted from	Withdrawn
ED79 1	ED75 765	24 March 2009
ED79 2	ED75 772	18 March 2005
ED79 3	ED75 773	31 March 2003
ED79 4	ED75 774	
ED79 5	ED75 776	1 July 2005
ED79 6	ED75 782	31 October 2003
ED79 7	ED75 763	
ED79 8	ED75 778	10 February 2006
ED79 9	ED75 779	
ED79 10	ED75 780	31 October 2012
ED79 11	ED75 781	
ED79 12	ED75 784	
ED79 13	ED75 785	
ED79 14	ED75 786	
ED79 15	ED75 787	30 April 2008
ED79 16	ED75 788	27 September 2004
ED79 17	ED75 789	10 February 2006
ED79 18	ED75 790	
ED79 19	ED75 791	30 April 2008
ED79 20	ED75 760	
ED79 21	ED75 783	25 August 2003

=== Special liveries ===
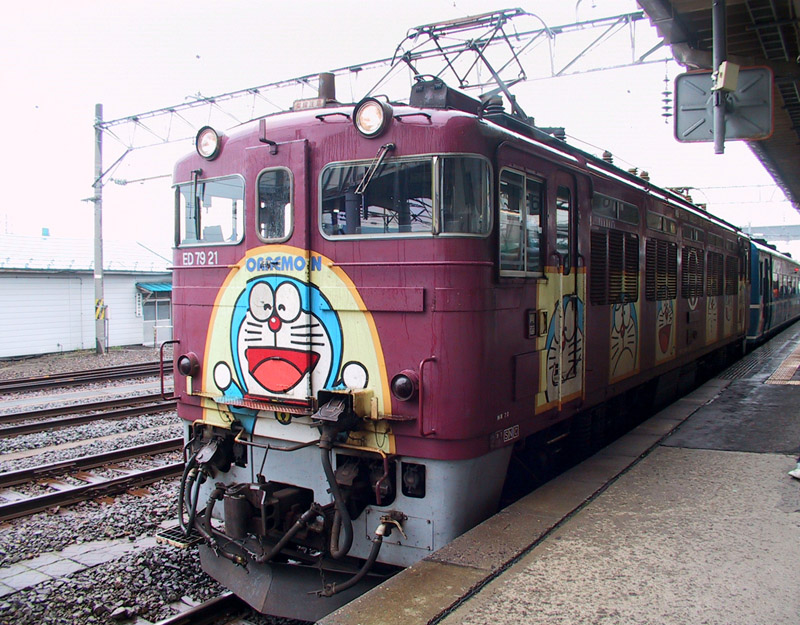
ED79 21 in July 2002

From February 2000, eight locomotives (numbers 3, 8, 10, 11, 14, 17, 19, and 21) received differing Doraemon liveries.

== ED79-50 ==
10 Class ED79-50 locomotives were built between 1989 and 1990 by Toshiba for JR Freight for use on freight services through the Seikan Tunnel. These locos were finished from new in the then-new JR Freight livery of pale purple and two-tone blue, with maroon ("Red No. 2") cab doors.

As of March 2015, nine out of the original ten Class ED79-50 locomotives remained in service, owned by JR Freight and based at Goryokaku Depot. These were normally used in pairs to haul freight services between Higashi-Aomori and Goryokaku via the Seikan Tunnel. All were scheduled to be withdrawn by March 2016 when the line voltage through the Seikan Tunnel was raised from 20 kV AC to 25 kV AC with the opening of the Hokkaido Shinkansen.

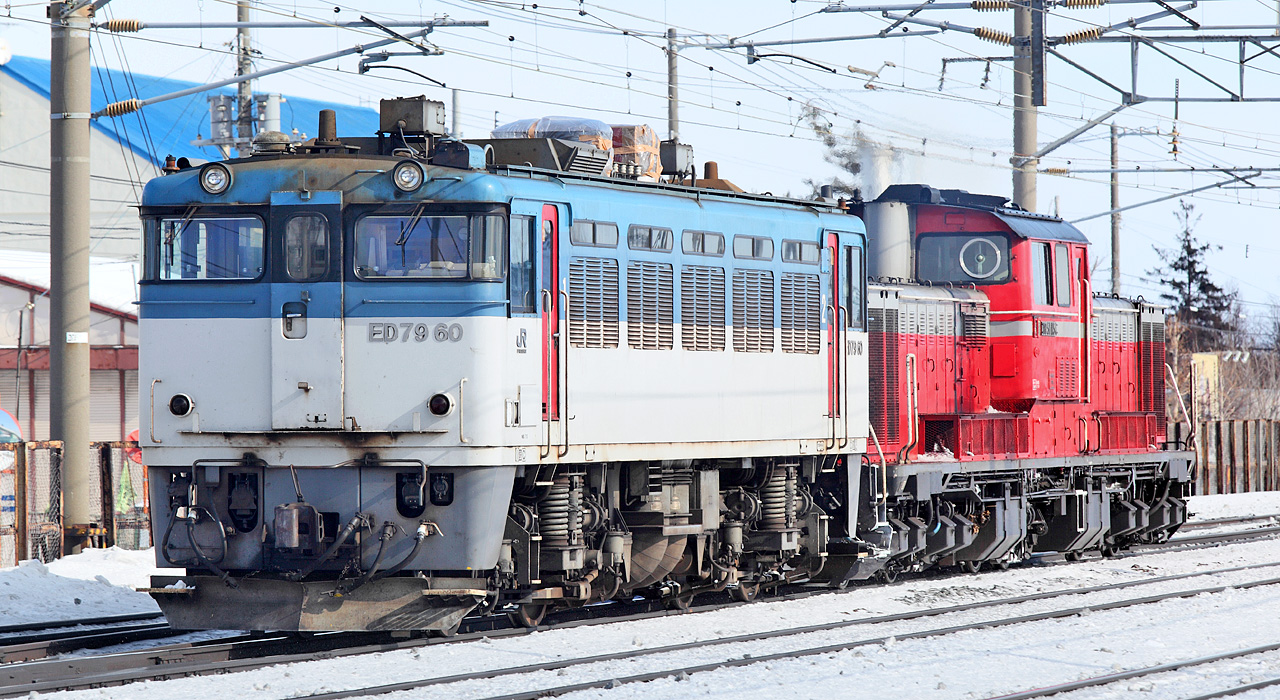
ED79 60 in February 2010

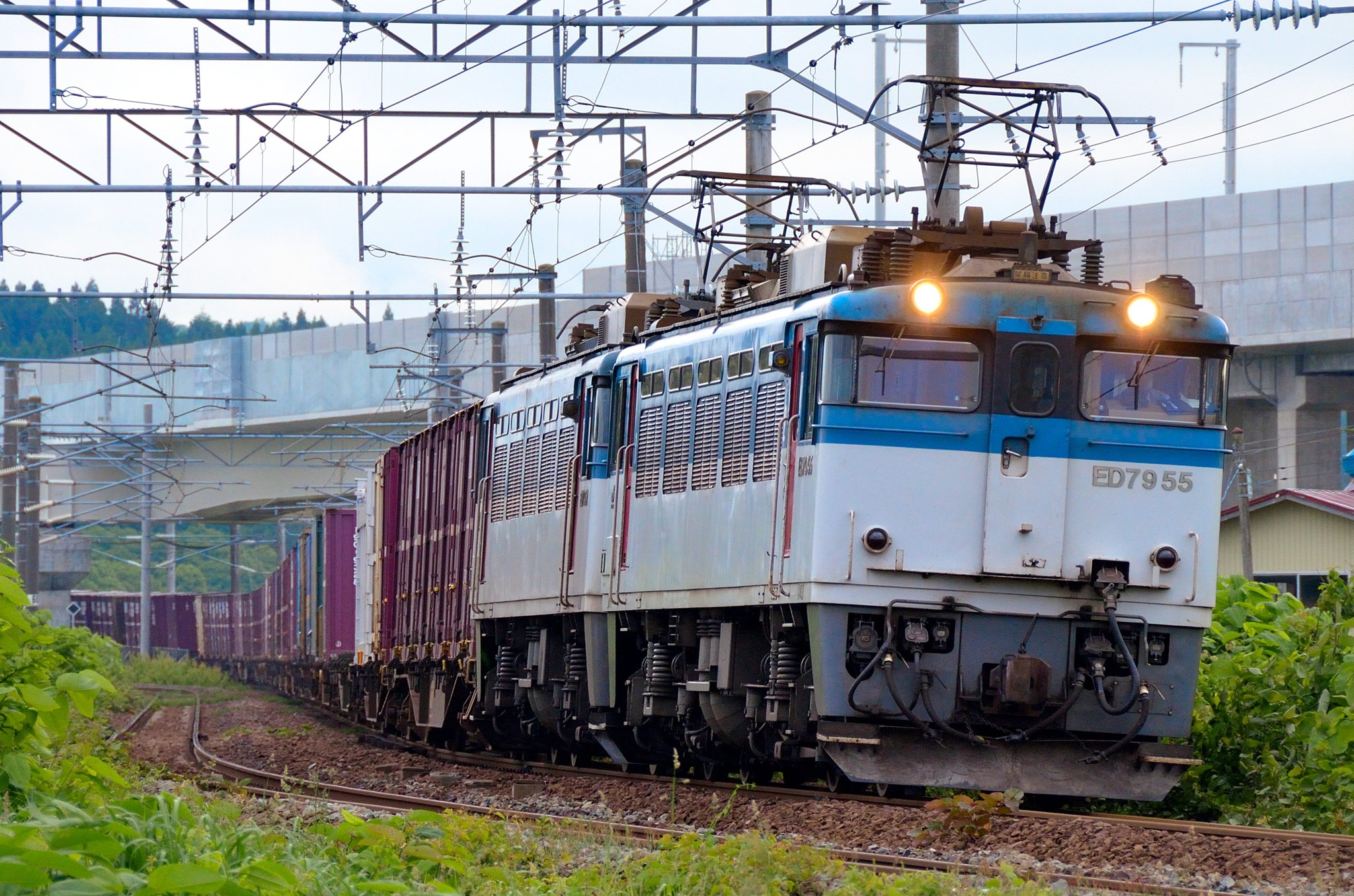
ED79 55 and 51 on a freight service in June 2013

The withdrawal dates for the fleet are shown below.

Number	Delivered	Withdrawn
ED79 51	-	
ED79 52	-	
ED79 53	-	
ED79 54	-	
ED79 55	-	
ED79 56	-	24 March 2000
ED79 57	-	
ED79 58	-	
ED79 59	-	
ED79 60	-	

== ED79-100 ==
13 Class ED79-100 locomotives were converted between 1986 and 1987 at JNR's Omiya, Tsuchizaki, and Naebo Workshops from former Class ED75-700 locomotives. As with the ED79-0 subclass, these were intended to haul freight and passenger trains through the undersea Seikan Tunnel between Honshu and Hokkaido, but as a cost-saving measure, only one cab end was equipped with the necessary ATC equipment, so these locomotives were only able to operate in multiple with an ED79-0 locomotive and were not permitted to run singly through the tunnel. An ED79-100 locomotive would be coupled at the northern end of an ED75-0.

With the privatization of JNR on 1 April 1987, all 13 locomotives were transferred to the ownership of JR Hokkaido, although they were also loaned for use on JR Freight services until 2006. The last remaining member of the sub-class was withdrawn in March 2009.

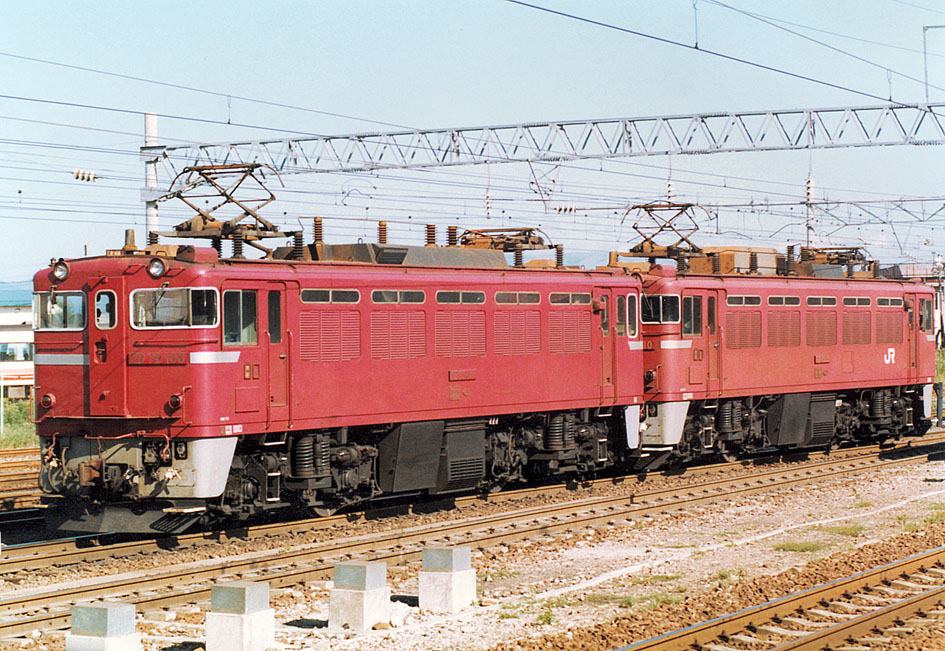
ED79 106 and ED79 10 in 1991

The fleet details are shown below.

Number	Converted from	Withdrawn
ED79 101	ED75 769	25 August 2003
ED79 102	ED75 718	31 March 2003
ED79 103	ED75 717	31 March 2001
ED79 104	ED75 720	24 March 2009
ED79 105	ED75 761	12 September 2002
ED79 106	ED75 728	28 December 2004
ED79 107	ED75 719	24 March 2009
ED79 108	ED75 724	24 March 2009
ED79 109	ED75 709	31 August 2003
ED79 110	ED75 732	10 February 2006
ED79 111	ED75 731	12 September 2002
ED79 112	ED75 738	27 September 2004
ED79 113	ED75 737	15 November 2001

== Classification ==
The ED79 classification for this locomotive type is explained below.

- E: Electric locomotive
- D: Four driving axles
- 7x: AC locomotive with maximum speed exceeding 85 km/h (55 mph)
