= JNR Class ED75 =

Class of 302 Japanese electric locomotives

Class ED75
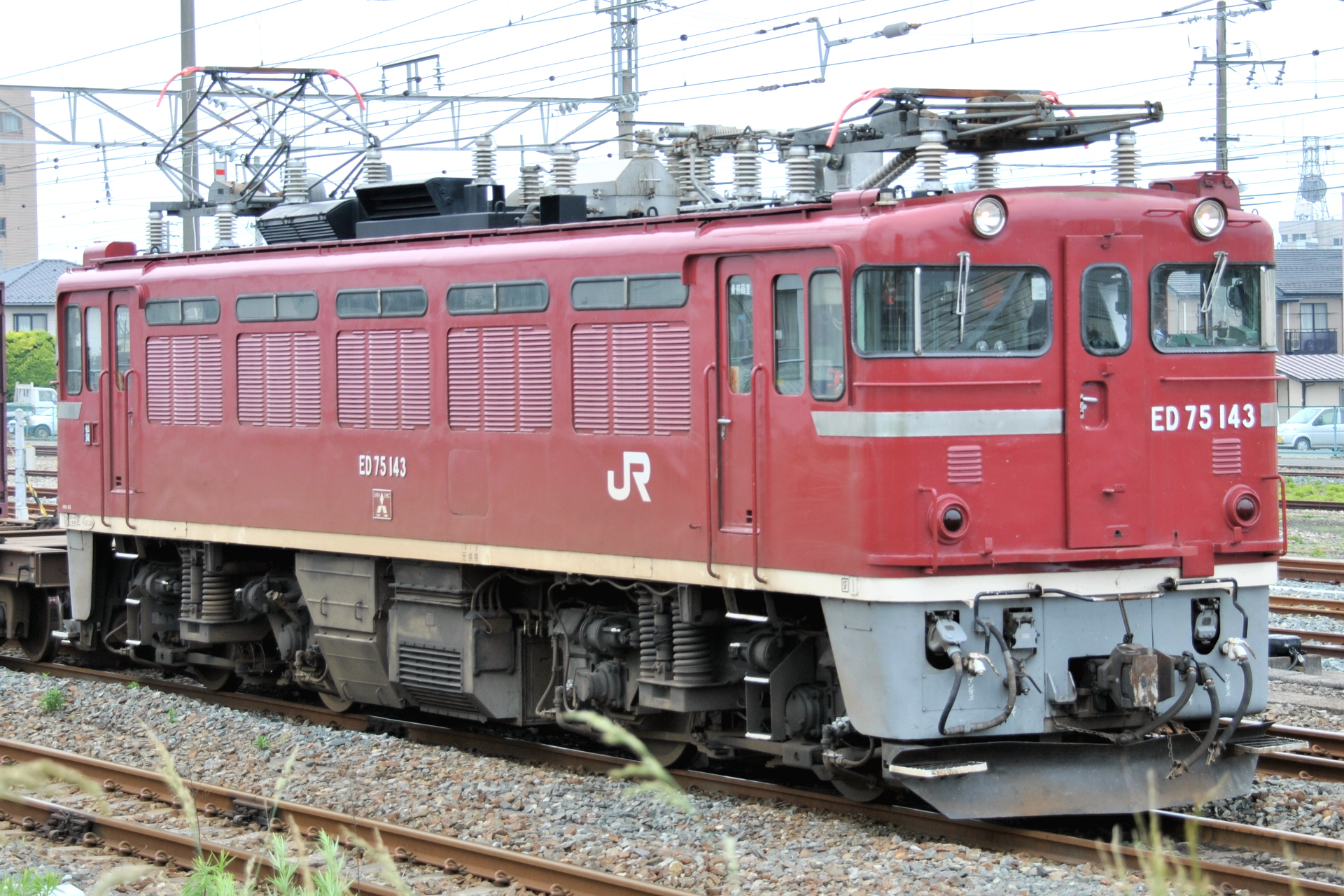
- JR Freight refurbished ED75 143, June 2010
Type and origin
- Power type: Electric
- Builder: Hitachi, Mitsubishi, Toshiba
- Build date: 1963–1976
- Total produced: 302
Specifications
- Configuration
  - UIC: Bo-Bo
- Gauge: 1,067 mm (3 ft 6 in)
- Bogies: DT129
- Wheel diameter: 1,120 mm (44.09 in)
- Length: 14,300 mm (46 ft 11 in)
- Width: 2,800 mm (9 ft 2 1/4 in)
- Loco weight: 67.2 t (66.1 long tons; 74.1 short tons)
- Electric system/s: 20 kV AC at 50/60 Hz Overhead catenary
- Current pickup: Pantograph
- Traction motors: MT52 x 4
- MU working: Within Class Only
- Loco brake: Air and Electrical regenerative
- Train brakes: Air
Performance figures
- Maximum speed: 100 km/h (60 mph)
- Power output: 1,900 kW (2,500 hp)
Career
- Operators: JNR; JR Freight; JR East
- Number in class: 5 (as of 1 April 2016)
- Delivered: 1963
- Preserved: 3
- Disposition: Still in service

The Class ED75 (ED75形) is a Bo-Bo wheel arrangement AC electric locomotive type operated on passenger and freight services in Japan since 1963. A total of 302 locomotives were built by Hitachi, Mitsubishi, and Toshiba between 1963 and 1976. As of 1 April 2016, just five locomotives remained in service, all operated by JR East.

== Variants ==
- ED75-0: Numbers ED75-1 – 160
- ED75-300: Numbers ED75-301 – 311
- ED75-500: Number ED75-501
- ED75-700: Numbers ED75-701 – 791
- ED75-1000: Numbers ED75-1001 – 1039

== ED75-0 ==
This was the original type. Two prototypes, ED75 1 and 2, were delivered in 1963, built by Hitachi and Mitsubishi. Following test running, a further 158 locomotives were built from 1964 by Hitachi, Mitsubishi, and Toshiba. Locomotive numbers 50 to 100 were equipped for cold regions, and were fitted with icicle cutters above the driving cab windows. As of 1 April 2016, no Class ED75-0 locomotives remained in service.

== ED75-300 ==
11 Class ED75-300 locomotives were built from 1965 to 1968 by Hitachi and Mitsubishi for use in Kyushu, numbered ED75 301 to ED75 311. These locomotives used a 20 kV AC 60 Hz power supply.

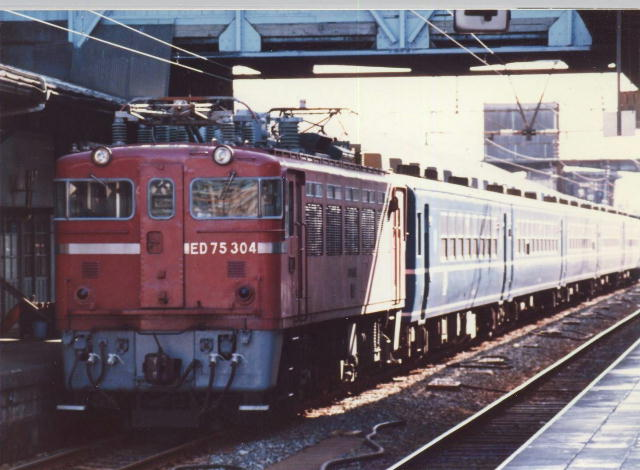
ED75 304 in the early 1980s

== ED75-500 ==
One Class ED75-500 locomotive, number ED75 501 was built experimentally for use on the recently electrified Hakodate Main Line between Otaru and Asahi in Hokkaido. No further locomotives in this sub-class were built, as Class ED76-500 locomotives were instead chosen for this route.

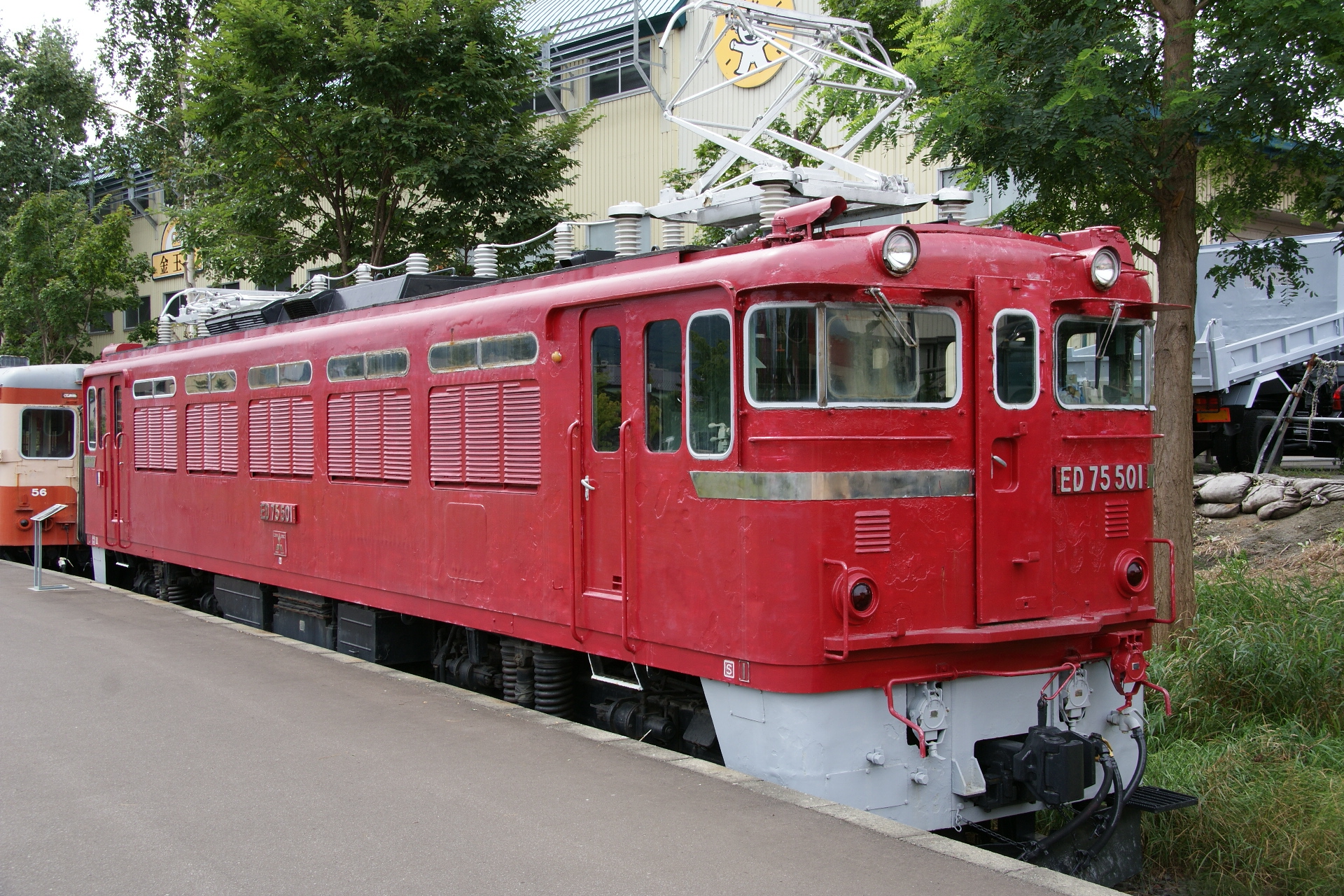
ED75-501, preserved at the Otaru City Museum, August 2009

== ED75-700 ==
91 Class ED75-700 locomotives were built from 1971 to 1976 by Hitachi, Mitsubishi, and Toshiba, for use on the Ou Main Line and Uetsu Main Line, numbered ED75 701 to ED75 791. These locomotives used a 20 kV AC 50 Hz power supply. These locomotives differed from earlier examples in having PS103 cross-arm type pantographs. 34 members of this subclass were converted to become Class ED79 locomotives in 1988 for use on services through the undersea Seikan Tunnel between Honshu and Hokkaido.

As of 1 April 2016, five Class ED75-700 locomotives remained in service, operated by JR East, with three locomotives based at Sendai and two at Akita.

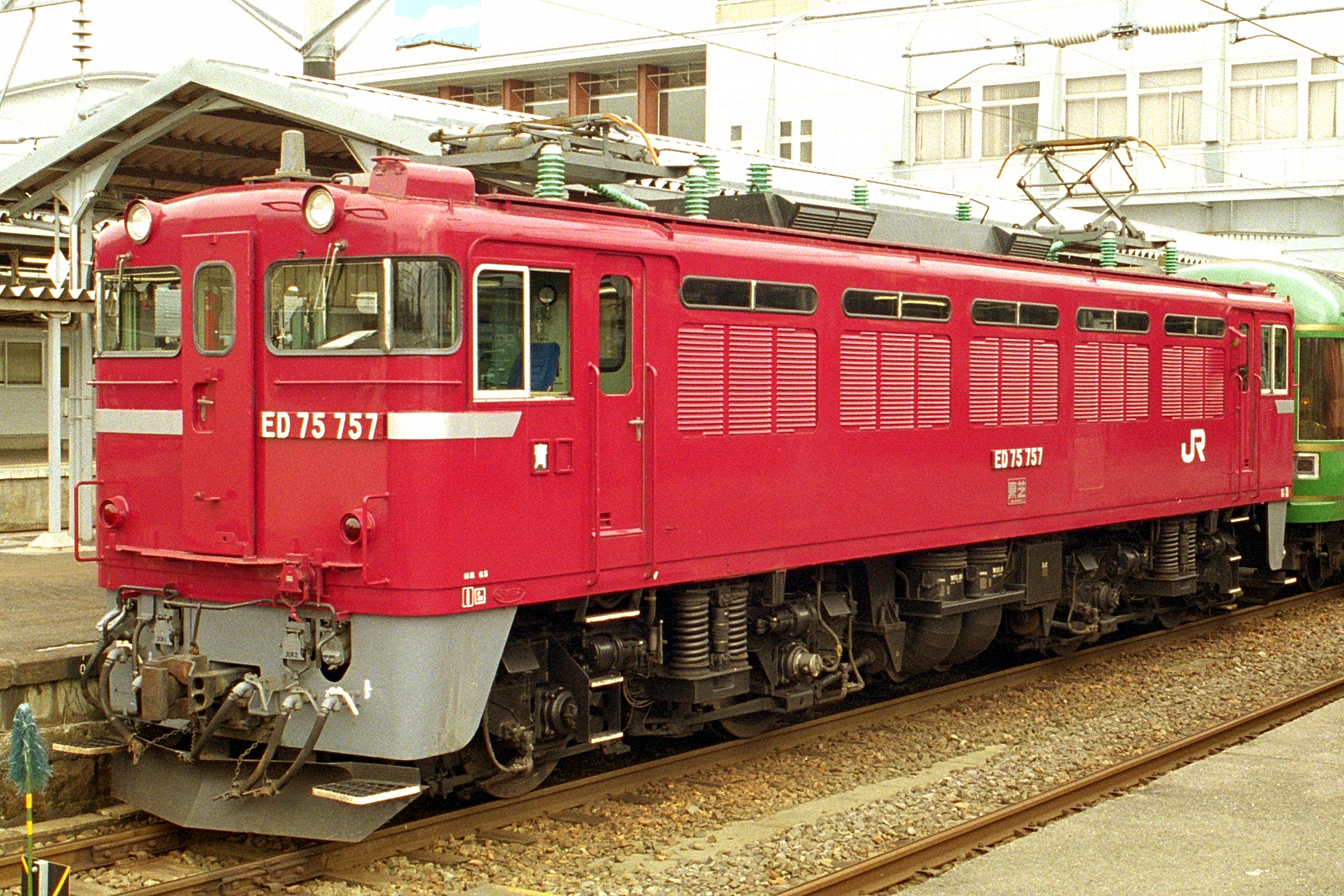
JR East ED75 757, July 2002

== ED75-1000 ==
The ED75-1000 subclass were built from 1968 for use on express freight services. 25 locomotives were built between 1968 and 1970, followed by a second batch of 14 locomotives built from 1973 to 1976, bringing the total to 39.

JR Freight started a programme of life-extension refurbishment of its Class ED75-1000 fleet from 1993, and refurbished locomotives were initially repainted in a new livery with the bottom half of the body sides finished in ivory. The livery applied to refurbished locomotives was subsequently simplified to just adding a white stripe along the bottom of the body sides.

From the start of the 17 March 2012 timetable revision, the remaining scheduled JR Freight workings using ED75 locomotives, operating in pairs, were completely replaced by JR Freight Class EH500 locomotives.

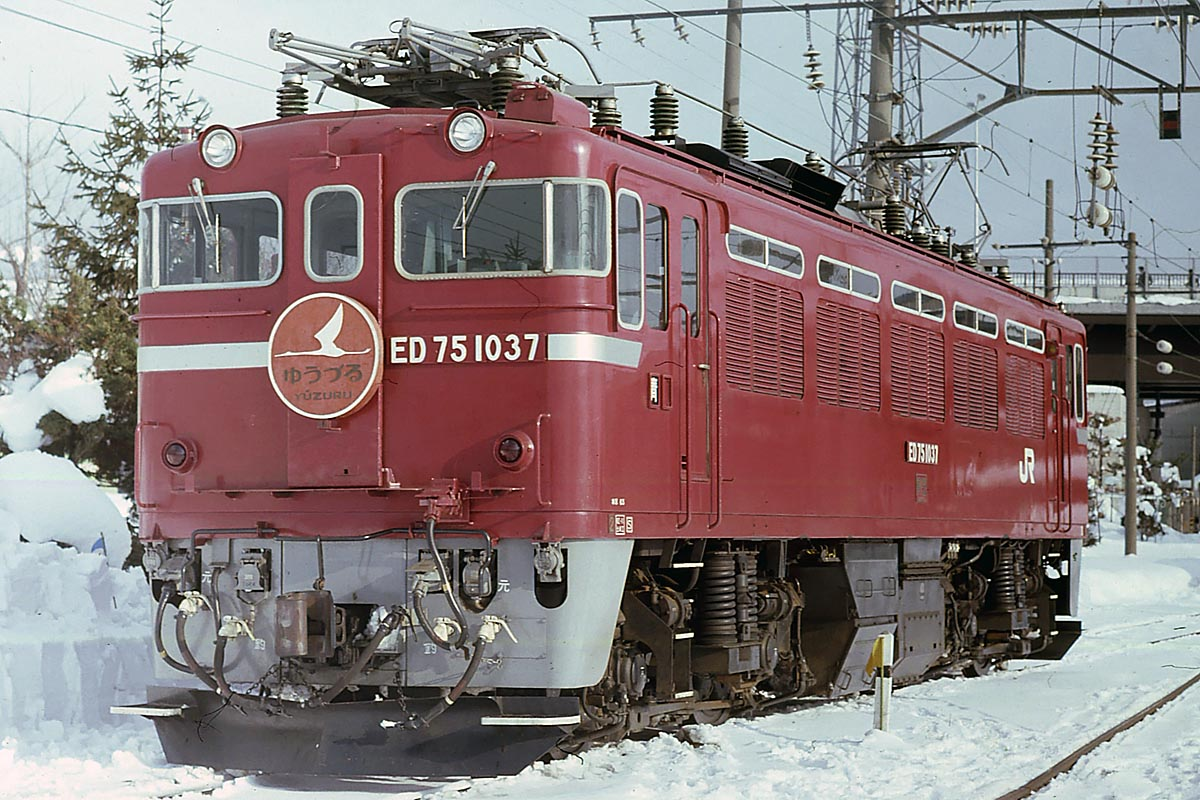
JR East ED75 1037 in February 1988

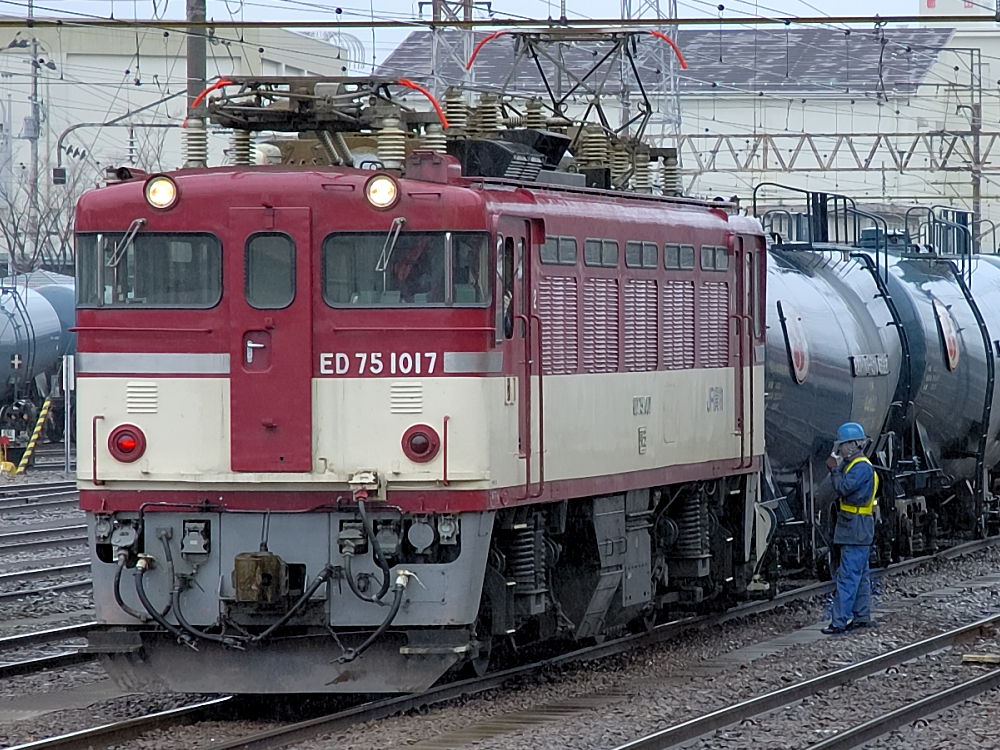
Refurbished JR Freight ED75 1017 in March 2007

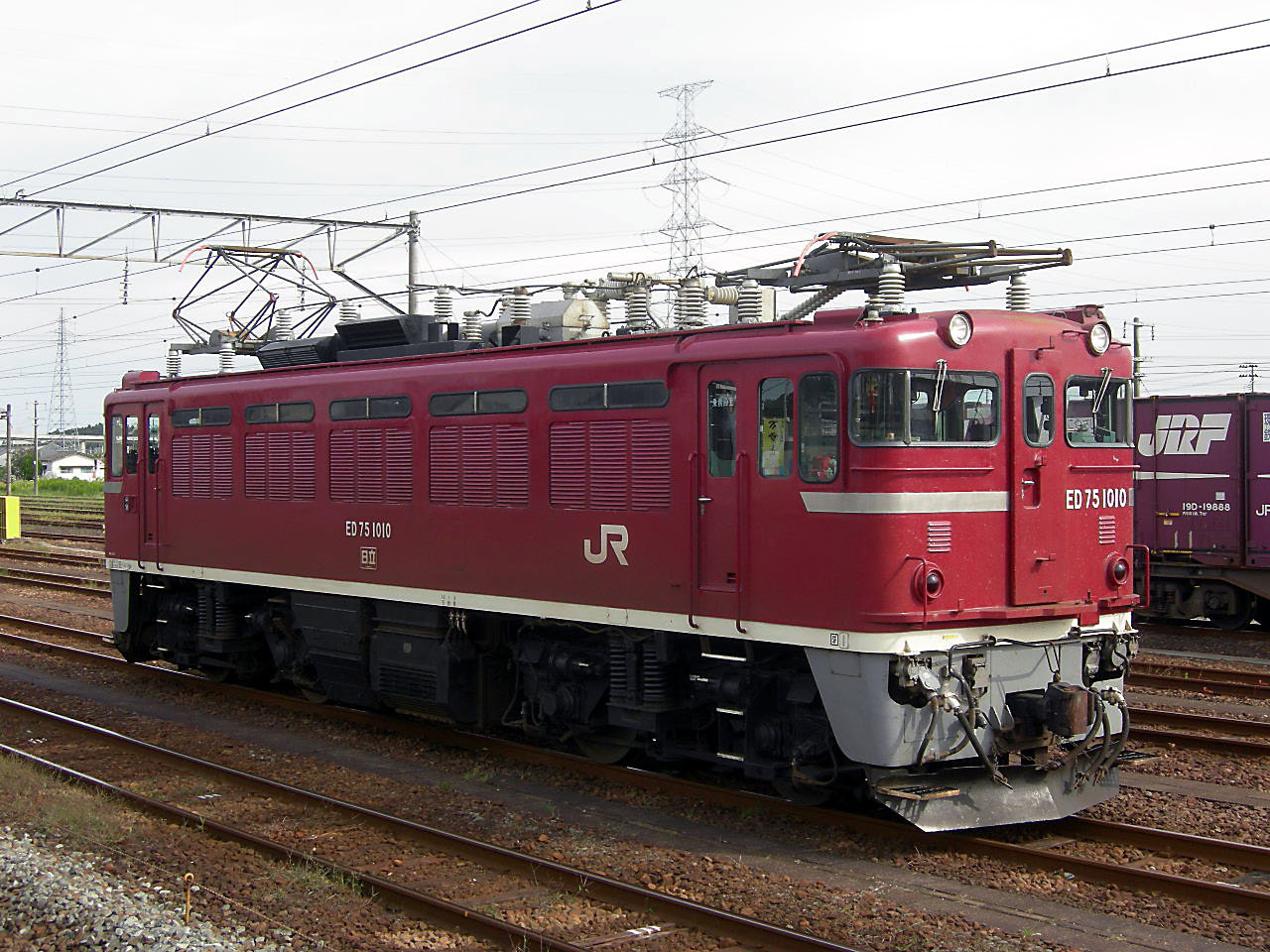
Refurbished JR Freight ED75 1010 in September 2008

== Livery variations ==
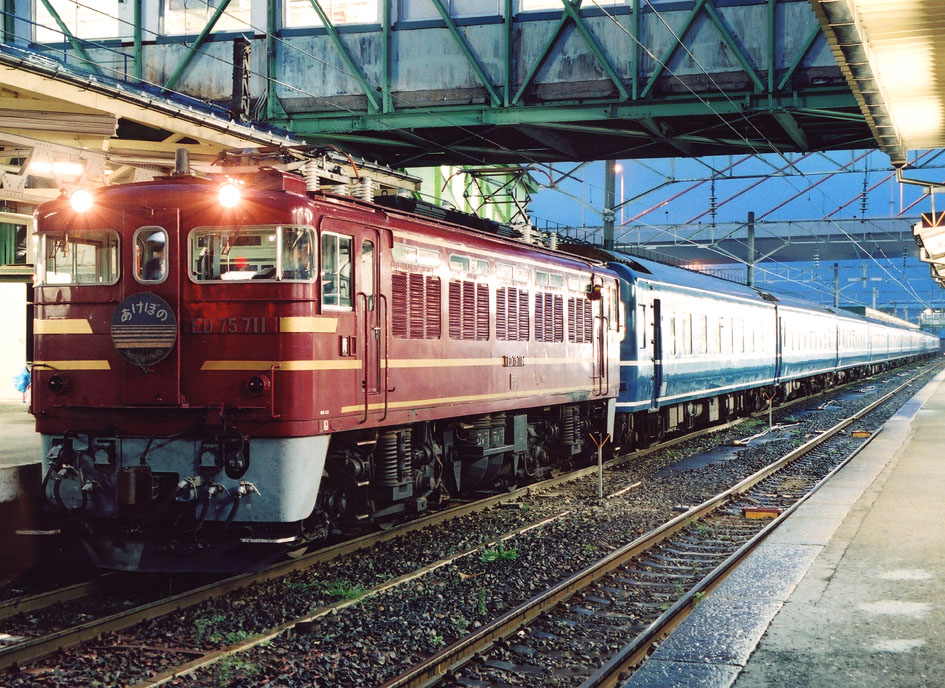
JR East ED75 711 in "Orient Saloon" livery

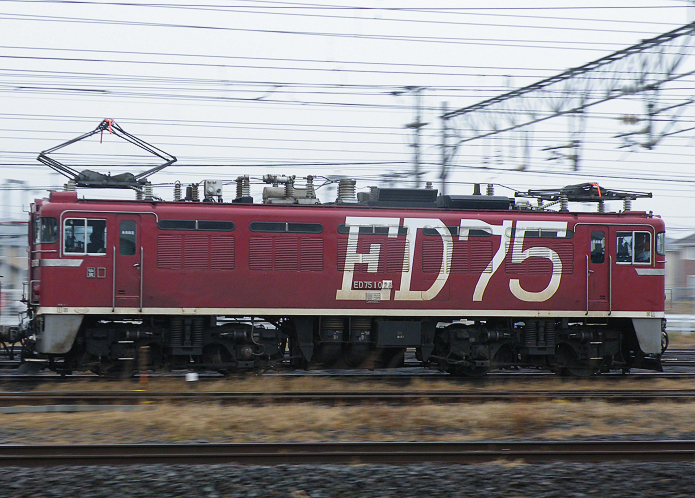
ED75 1028 in "Express Rainbow" livery in January 2009

== Preserved examples ==
As of 2014, three examples have been preserved, as listed below.

- ED75 1: Sendai Shinkansen Depot in Rifu, Miyagi
- ED75 501: Otaru City Museum, Otaru, Hokkaido
- ED75 775: The Railway Museum in Saitama
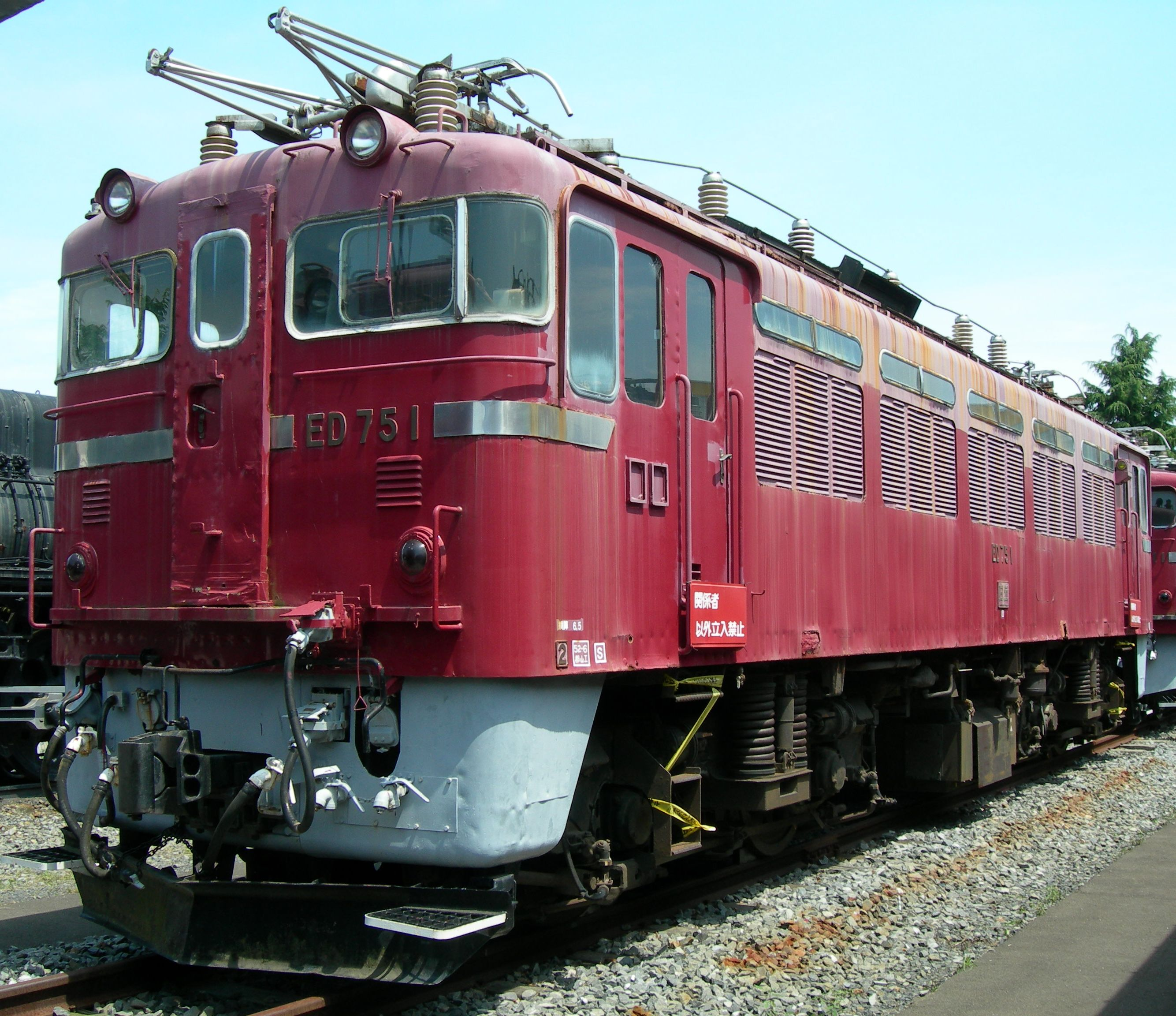
ED75 1 preserved at Sendai Shinkansen Depot in July 2009

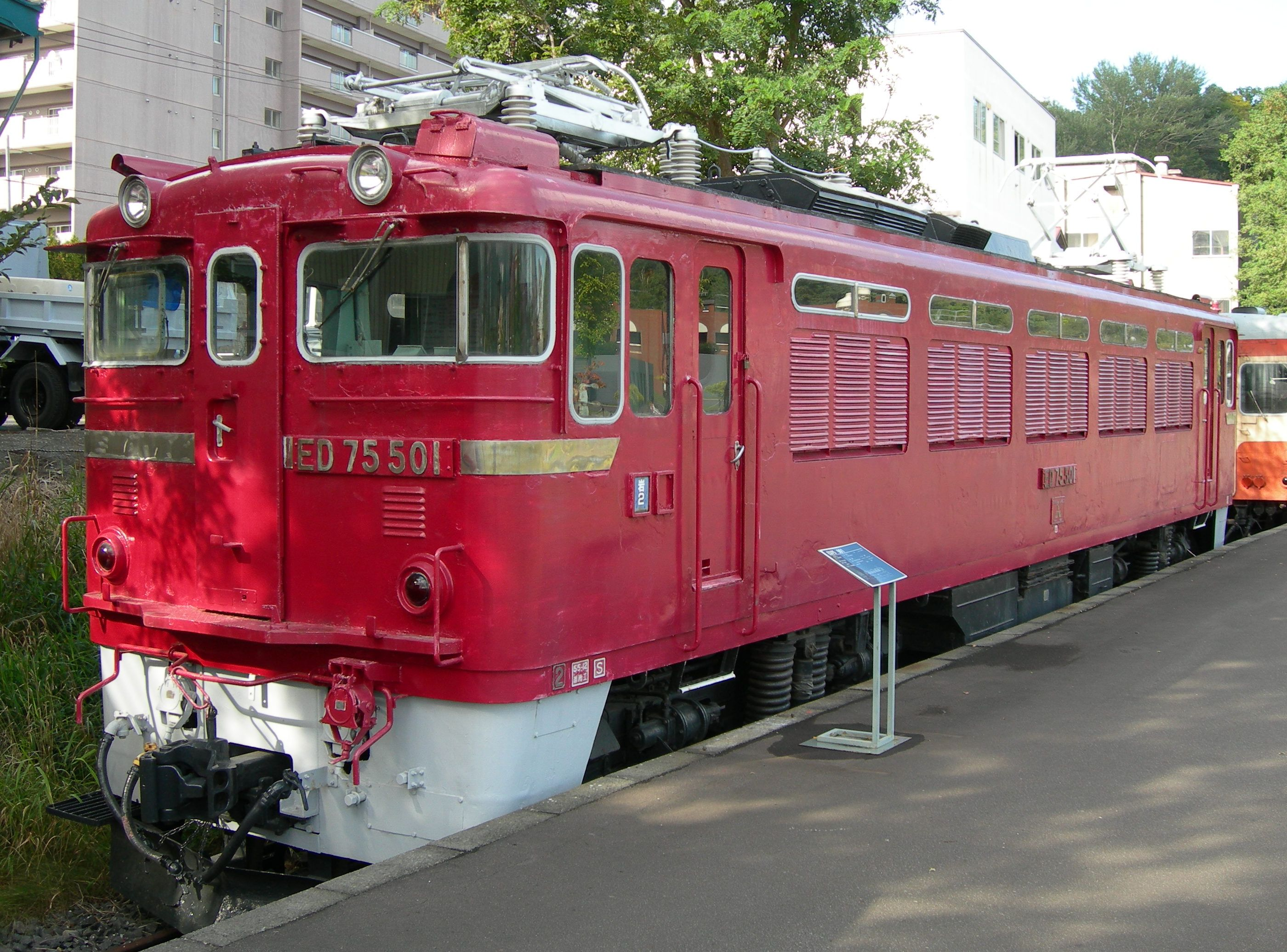
ED75-501 preserved at the Otaru City Museum in September 2009

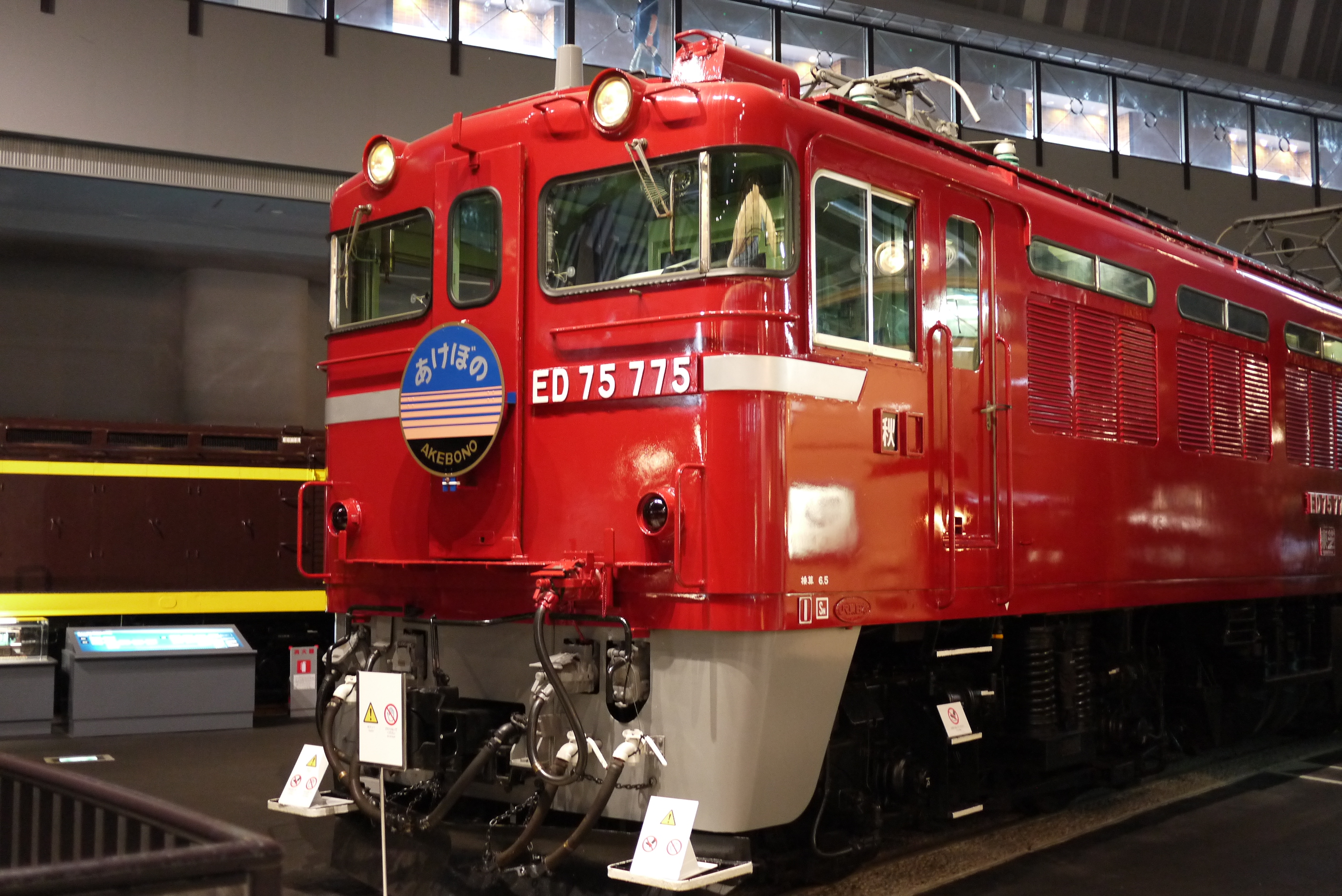
ED75 775 at The Railway Museum in Saitama in May 2012

== Classification ==
The ED75 classification for this locomotive type is explained below.

- E: Electric locomotive
- D: Four driving axles
- 7x: AC locomotive with maximum speed exceeding 85 km/h (55 mph)

== See also ==
- Railway electrification in Japan
