= JNR Class ED78 =

Class of 14 Japanese electric locomotives

Class ED78
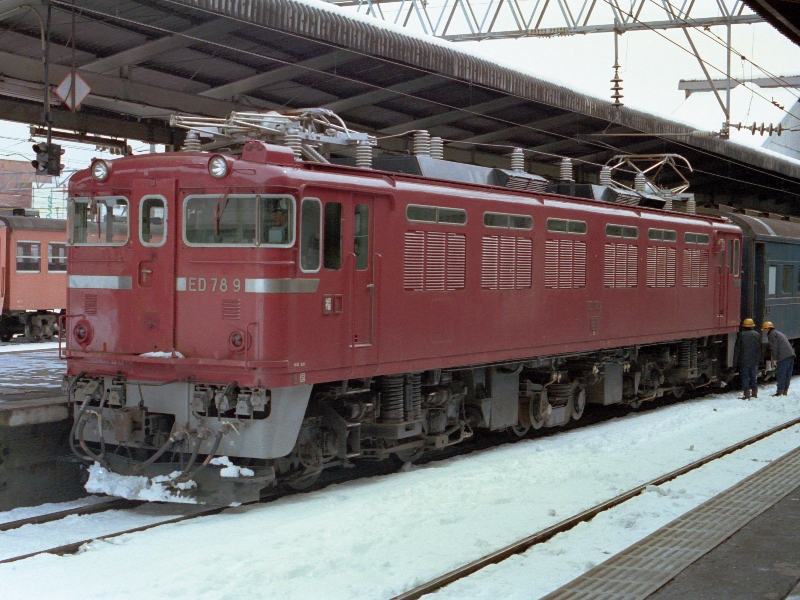
- ED78 9 in service in March 1985
Type and origin
- Power type: Electric
- Builder: Hitachi
- Build date: 1967–1980
- Total produced: 14
Specifications
- Configuration
  - UIC: Bo'2Bo'
  - Commonwealth: Bo-2-Bo
- Gauge: 1,067 mm (3 ft 6 in)
- Bogies: DT129 (outer), DR103E (centre)
- Wheel diameter: 1,120 mm (44.09 in)
- Trailing dia.: 860 mm (33.86 in)
- Length: 17,900 mm (58 ft 8 3/4 in)
- Width: 2,800 mm (9 ft 2 1/4 in)
- Height: 4,230 mm (13 ft 10 1/2 in)
- Loco weight: 81.5 t (80.2 long tons; 89.8 short tons)
- Electric system/s: 20 kV AC at 60 Hz overhead wire
- Current pickup: Pantograph
Performance figures
- Power output: 1,900 kW (2,500 hp)
Career
- Operators: JNR, JR East
- Numbers: ED78 1–13, ED78 901
- Delivered: 1967
- Preserved: 1
- Disposition: All withdrawn

The Class ED78 (ED78形) was a Bo-2-Bo wheel arrangement AC electric locomotive type operated in Japan from 1968 until the 1990s. 14 locomotives were built by Hitachi between 1967 and 1980.

== Operations ==
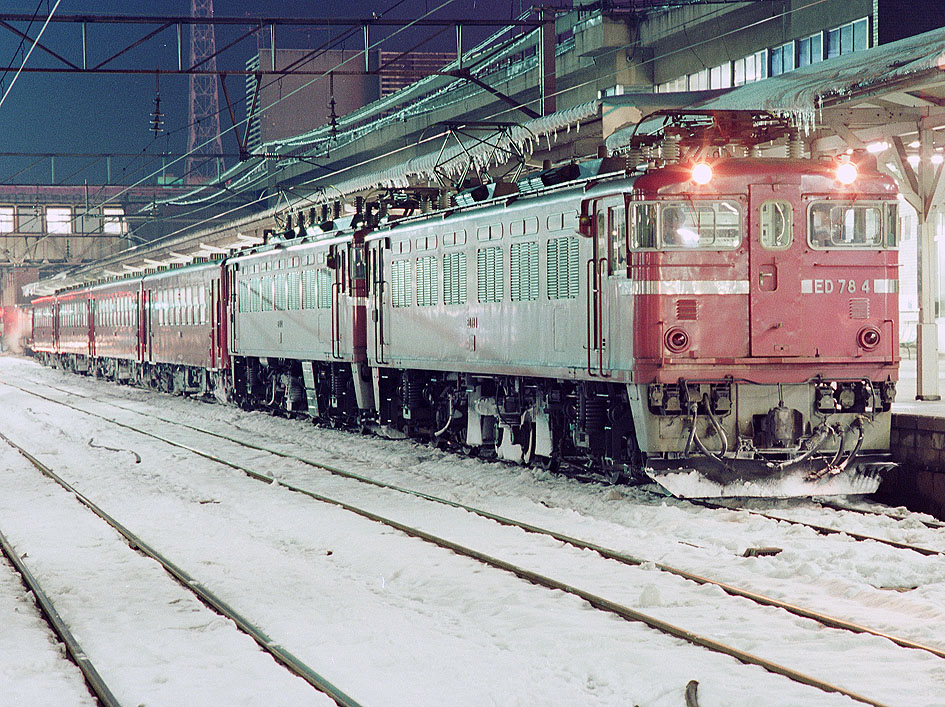
ED78 4 double-heading a local passenger service with a class EF71 in the 1980s

The locomotives were introduced to operate on the steeply-graded Ou Main Line between Fukushima and Yonezawa, which was converted from 1,500 V DC electrification to 20 kV AC in October 1968. The locomotives often worked in multiple with Class EF71 locomotives.

== History ==
A prototype locomotive, initially classified ED94 and numbered ED94 1, was delivered in 1967, with full-production locomotives delivered from 1968 until 1980. ED94 1 was modified and renumbered ED78 901 in 1968. All 14 locomotives were built by Hitachi in Mito, Ibaraki, with modifications to convert ED94 1 to ED78 901 carried out at JNR's Koriyama factory.

Following the conversion of the Ou Main Line to standard gauge as part of the Yamagata Shinkansen in 1992, the Class ED78s were transferred to duties on the Tohoku Main Line and Senzan Line before ultimately being withdrawn.

=== Build history ===
The individual build dates of the fleet were as follows.

Number	Build year	Remarks
ED78 901	1967	Originally built as ED94 1
ED78 1	1968	
ED78 2	1968	
ED78 3	1968	
ED78 4	1968	
ED78 5	1968	
ED78 6	1968	
ED78 7	1968	
ED78 8	1968	
ED78 9	1968	
ED78 10	1970	
ED78 11	1970	
ED78 12	1980	
ED78 13	1980	

== Preserved examples ==
As of 2015, one member of the class is preserved: ED78 1. This locomotive was withdrawn in February 1987, and was subsequently stored at Fukushima Depot before being preserved at Fukushima Station. It was then moved to a site adjoining Rifu Station in Miyagi Prefecture, and later moved to the nearby Sendai General Shinkansen Depot. It was moved to Hitachi's Mito factory in Hitachinaka, Ibaraki in 2015 and cosmetically restored in 2016.

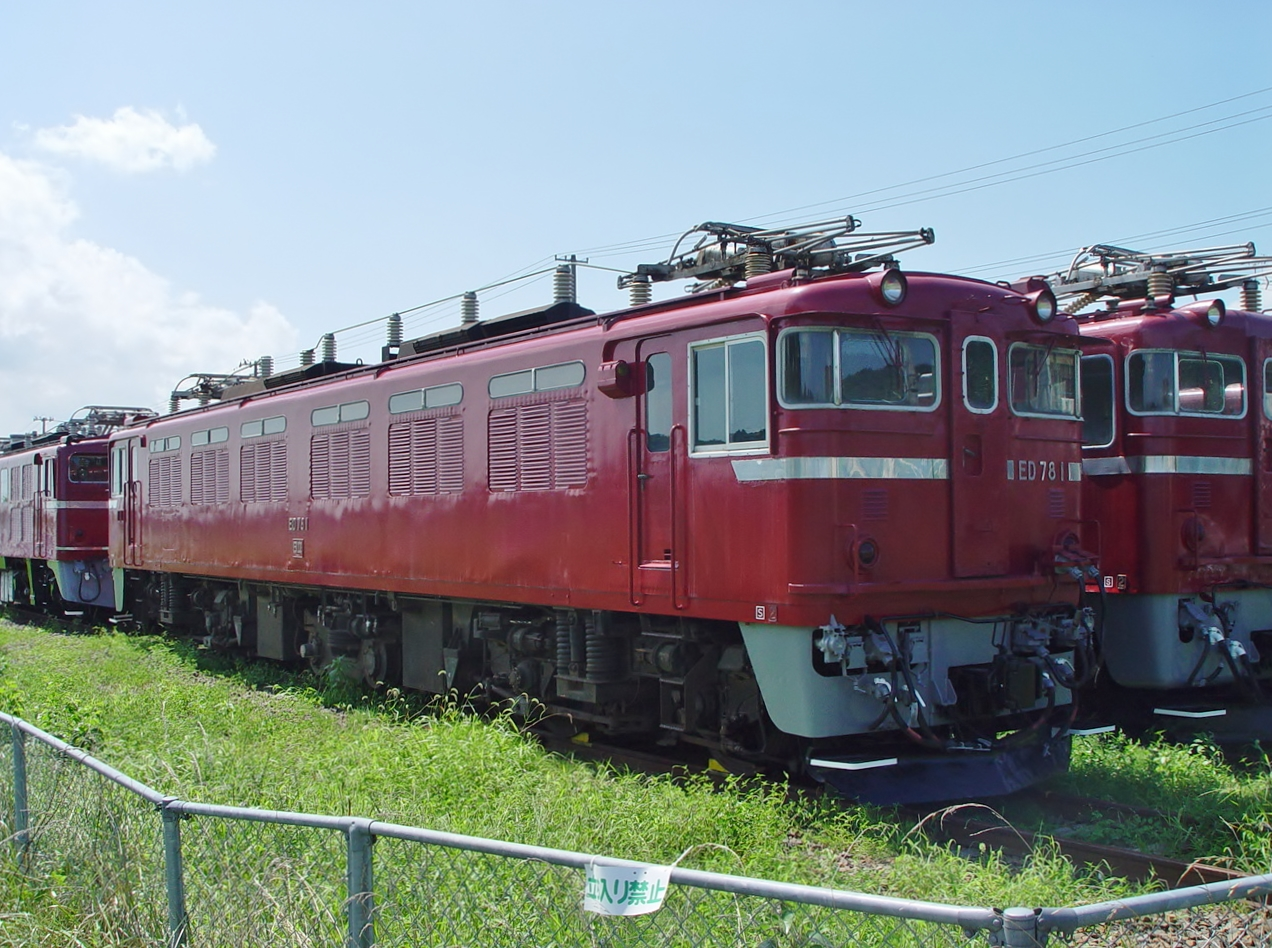
ED78 1 preserved near Rifu Station in August 2002

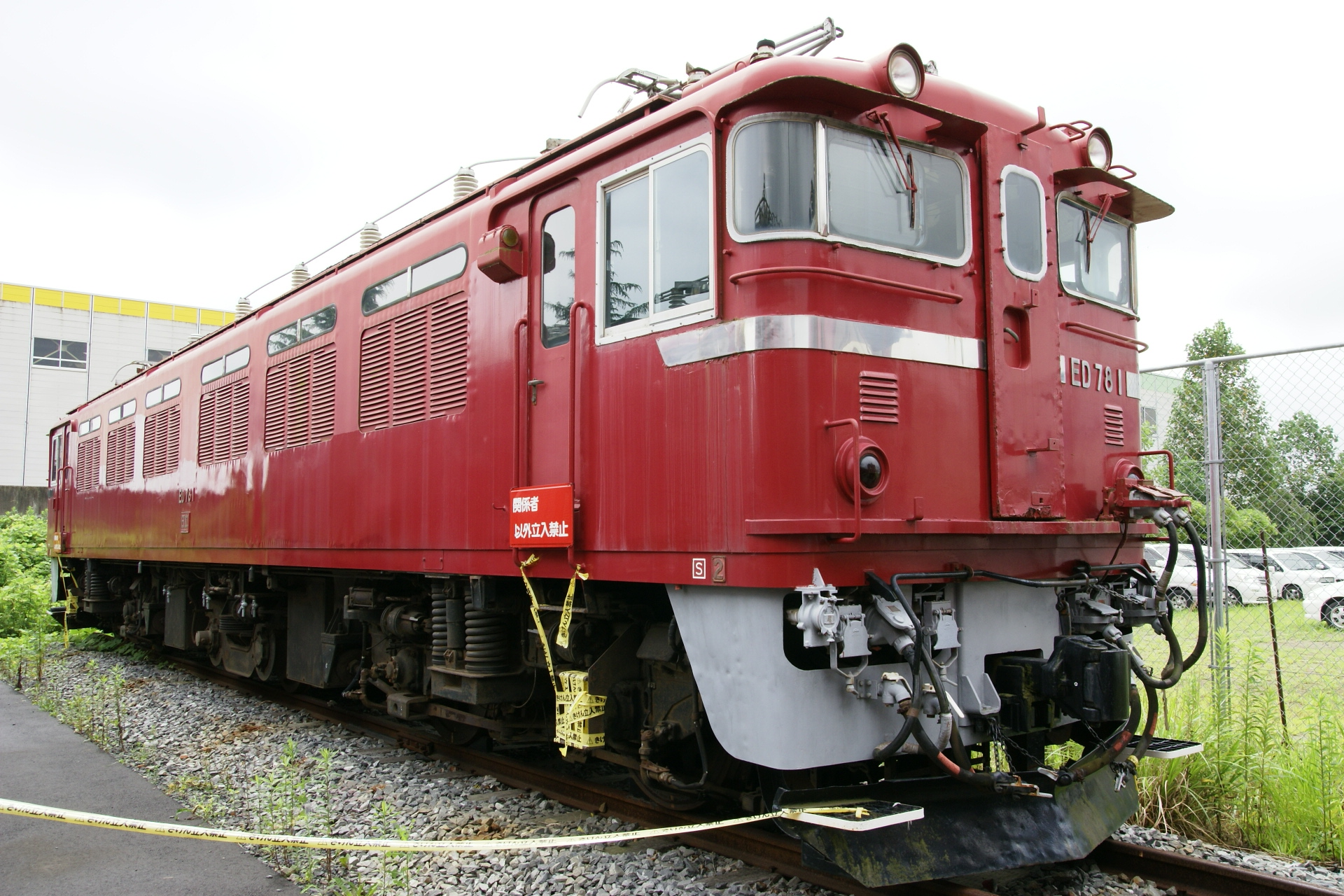
ED78 1 preserved at Sendai General Depot in July 2008

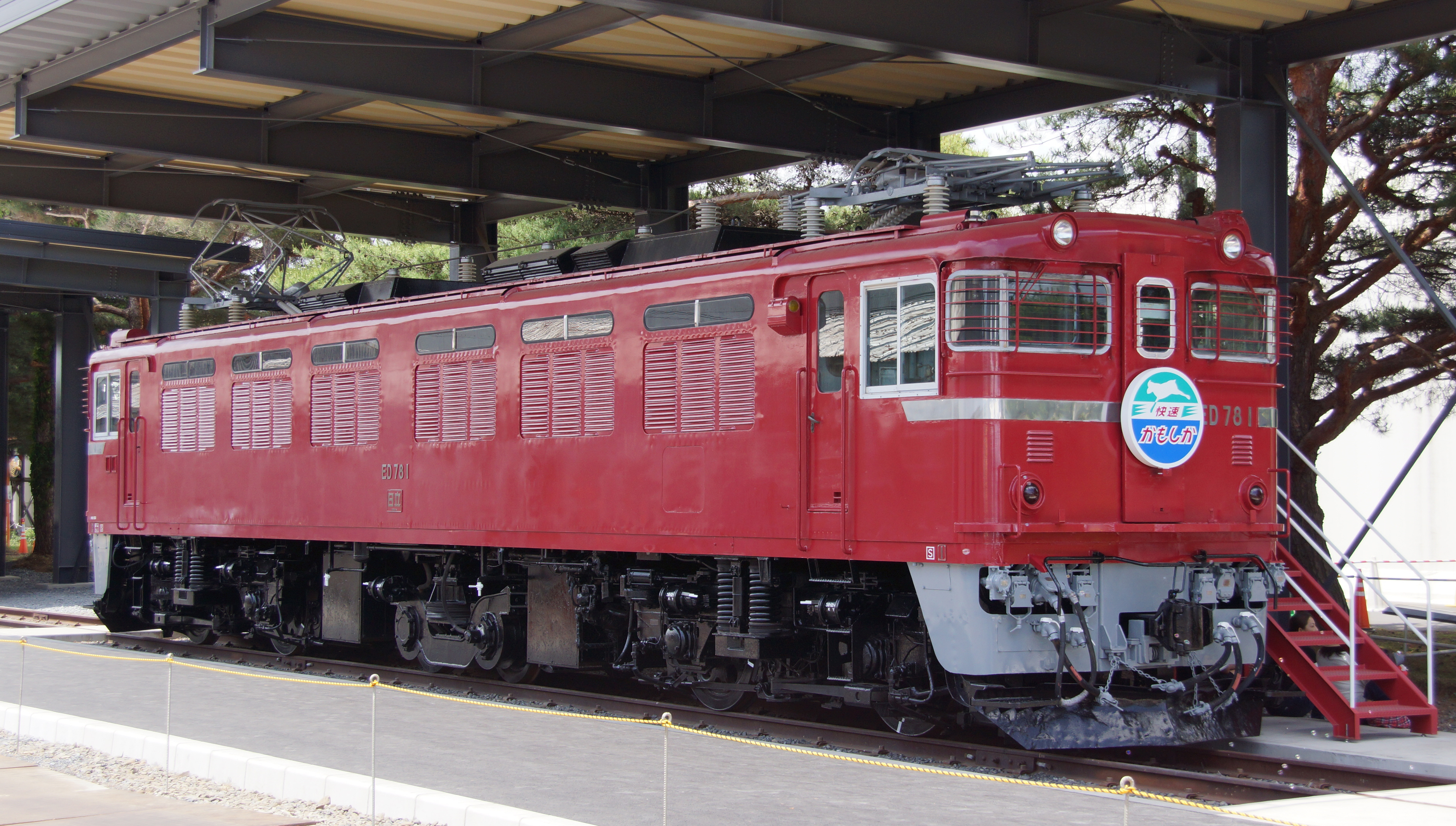
ED78 1 preserved inside the Hitachi Mito factory in May 2017

== Classification ==
The ED78 classification for this locomotive type is explained below.

- E: Electric locomotive
- D: Four driving axles
- 7x: AC locomotive with maximum speed exceeding 85 km/h (55 mph)
