= Hokuriku =

Hokuriku may refer to:

- Hokuriku (train), a sleeping car train in Japan
- Hokuriku Shinkansen, a high-speed railway line connecting Tokyo with Kanazawa
- The Hokuriku region in Japan
- ALO's Hokuriku, a Japanese football club based in Toyama, Japan
