= JNR Class EF62 =

Japanese electric locomotive class

Class EF62
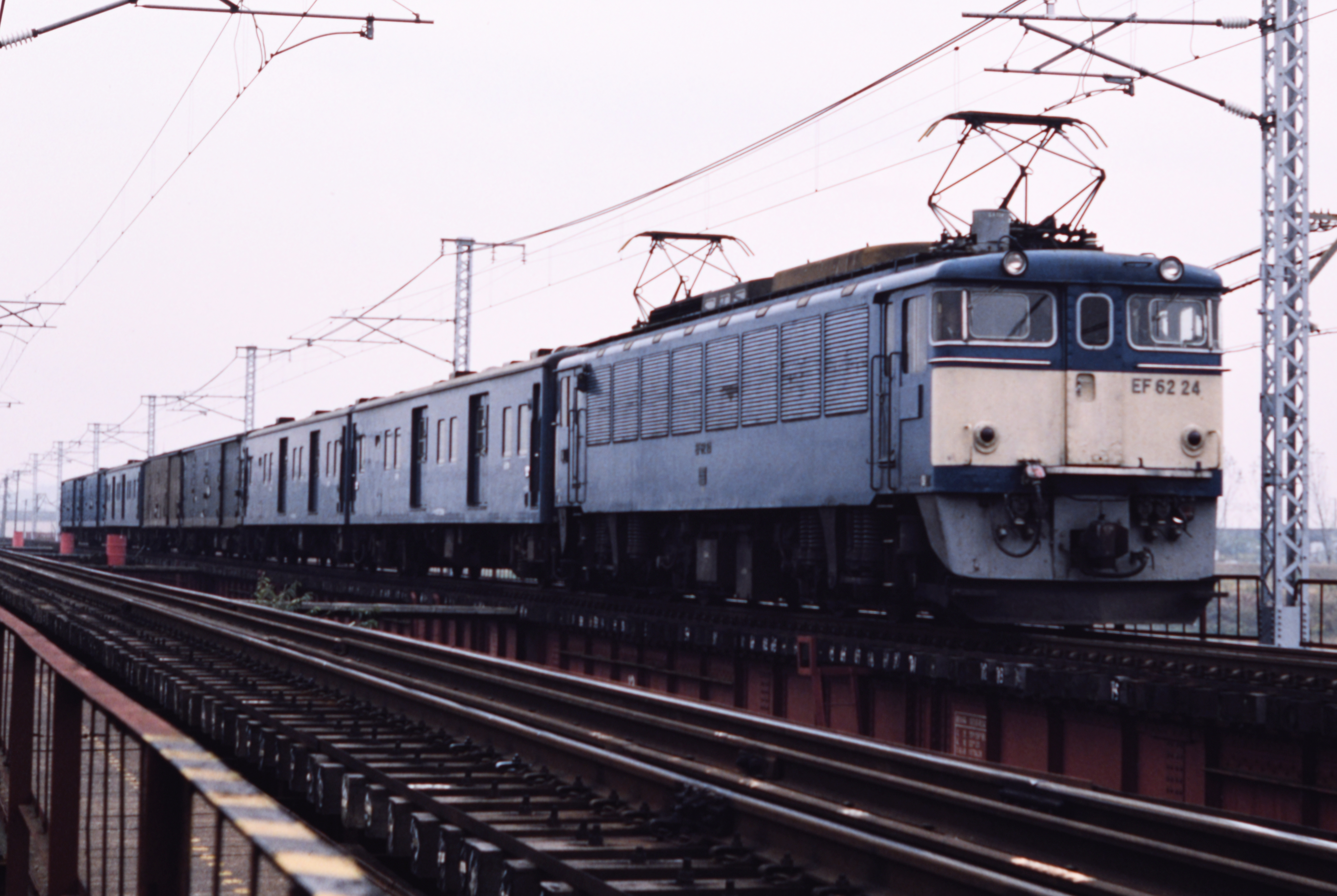
- EF62 24 pulling a parcels train crossing the Ibogawa River on the San'yo Main Line, 28 October 1986
Type and origin
- Power type: Electric
- Builder: Kawasaki Heavy Industries Rolling Stock Company, Tōshiba, Tōyō & Kisha Seizo
- Build date: 1962–1969
Specifications
- Configuration
  - UIC: Co′Co′
- Gauge: 1,067 mm (3 ft 6 in)
- Wheel diameter: 1,120 mm (44.09 in)
- Length: 18,000 mm (59 ft 5/8 in)
- Width: 2,800 mm (9 ft 2 1/4 in)
- Height: 4,060 mm (13 ft 3 7/8 in)
- Loco weight: 96 t (94 long tons; 106 short tons)
- Electric system/s: 1,500 V DC overhead line
- Current pickup: Pantograph
- Traction motors: DC
Performance figures
- Maximum speed: 100 km/h (60 mph)
- Power output: 2.55 MW (3,420 hp)
Career
- Operators: JNR, JR East
- Number in class: 54
- Preserved: 4
- Disposition: All withdrawn

The Class EF62 (EF62形) is a Co′Co′ wheel arrangement DC electric locomotive type built between 1962 and 1969 for use hauling passenger and freight on the Shinetsu Main Line and particularly over the extreme 66.7‰, (6.67%), gradient of the Usui Pass between Yokokawa and Karuizawa. The prototype, EF62 1, was built by Kawasaki Sharyō in 1962, with the full-production locomotives built by Kawasaki, Tōshiba, and Tōyō & Kisha delivered from 1963 onward.

== Design ==
The EF62s were the first adhesion locomotives used on the Shinetsu Main Line following the abandonment of the under-powered ED42 rack-and-pinion locos dating from the 1930s. They were designed to work in multiple with pairs of the specially designed JNR Class EF63 "Sherpa" locomotives between Yokokawa and Karuizawa.

While high adhesion was clearly an important requirement, the locos had to be designed with a low axle load (16 t, compared to 18 t for the EF63s) allowing them to be used on other sections of the Shinetsu Main Line with stricter axle-load restrictions. The need to reduce overall weight was one reason behind the decision to use the unique Co′Co′ wheel arrangement rather than the more commonly used Bo′Bo′Bo′ arrangement.

The need to reduce unnecessary weight led to the EF62s being the first DC electric locomotives in Japan to include an electric generator (320 kW) for train heating rather than using a steam generator. The locos also made extensive use of FRP (fibreglass-reinforced plastic) for roof panels, again to reduce weight.

== Operations ==
Adhesion working started between Yokokawa and Karuizawa in 1963, and the journey time between these two stations was reduced from the 42 minutes taken on the old rack-and-pinion line to 17 minutes (ascending) and 24 minutes (descending). This enabled train frequency to be increased, and freight trains of up 400 tonnes could be handled by an EF62 assisted by two EF63s. The EF62s were able to operate over the entire route from Ueno to Nagano, and were thus seen on a wide range of duties from freight to express passenger workings. The 1970s however saw a switch from loco-hauled to EMU passenger trains during the daytime, and so the EF62s primarily became freight locomotives.

Two members of the class, EF62 12 and 35, suffered an early demise when they were withdrawn following an accident in which they and two EF63s overturned after running away down the Usui Pass section.

The capacity and speed restrictions of the Usui Pass still represented a serious bottleneck, and in 1984, all freight operations over the section were discontinued and rerouted via the Chūō Main Line. This made a large number of the class surplus to requirements, and 26 were reallocated to Shimonoseki depot in 1984 for use on Shiodome (Tokyo) to Shimonoseki freight services. However, the EF62s proved unsuitable for these duties, and this sub-fleet was withdrawn before JNR became JR in 1987, leaving a small number of locomotives still working on Shinetsu Mainline duties.

== Post-privatization and withdrawal ==
Privatization saw six EF62s pass into JR East's books for use on the overnight "Noto" express and seasonal trains. Three operational locos (EF62 43, 46, 54) remained when the Yokokawa – Karuizawa section was closed in October 1997, and their final duties involved hauling withdrawn EF63s for scrapping before they themselves were withdrawn in 1998.

== Preserved examples ==
Three Class EF62 locomotives are preserved statically.

- EF62 1: Preserved at Usui Pass Railway Heritage Park in Annaka, Gunma
- EF62 3: Stored at JR East's Nagano Works (this unit was dismantled in September 2019)
- EF62 18: JR East's Omiya Works in Saitama, Saitama (cab section only)
- EF62 54: Preserved at Usui Pass Railway Heritage Park in Annaka, Gunma
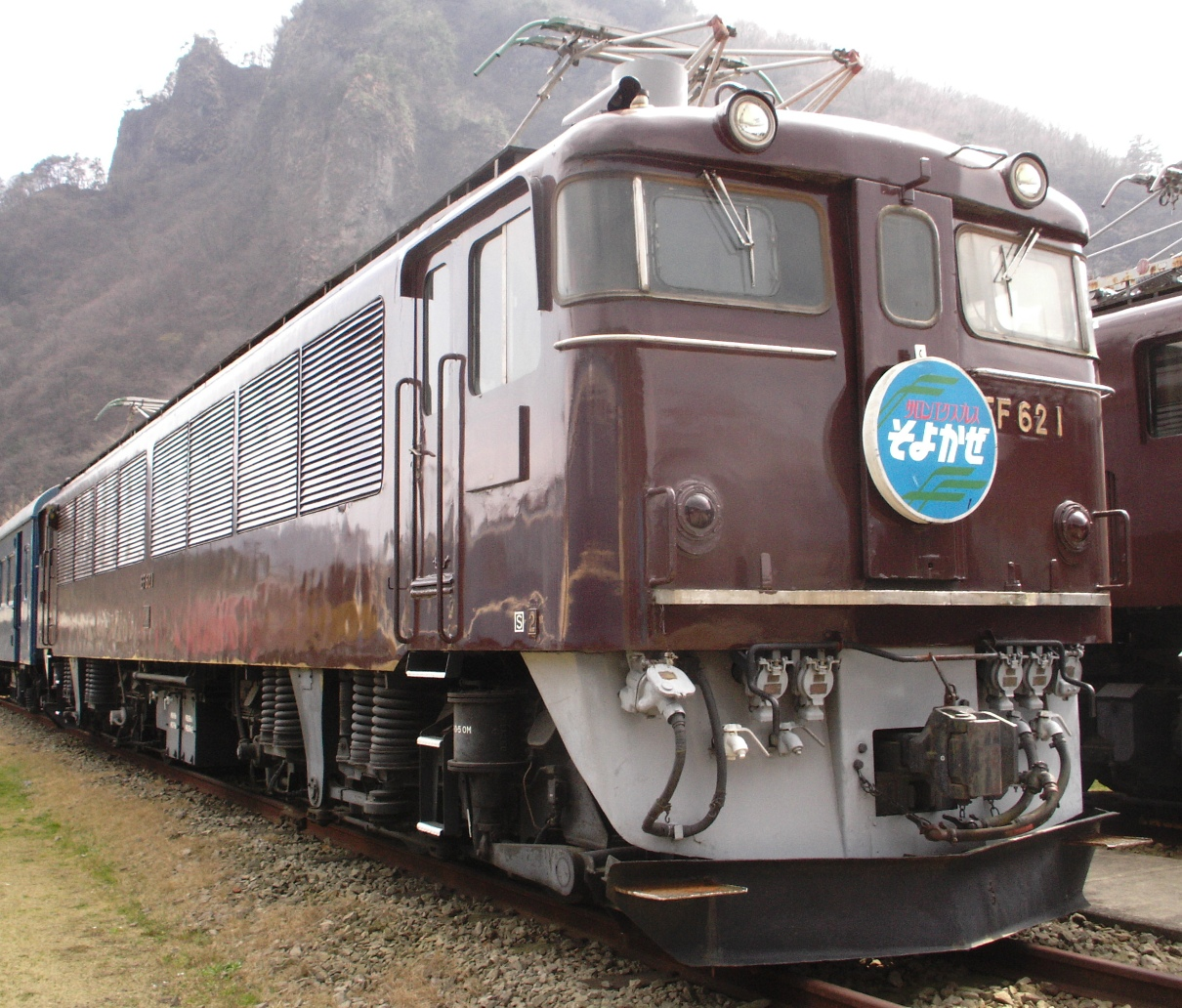
EF62 1 at the Usui Pass Railway Heritage Park, April 2007

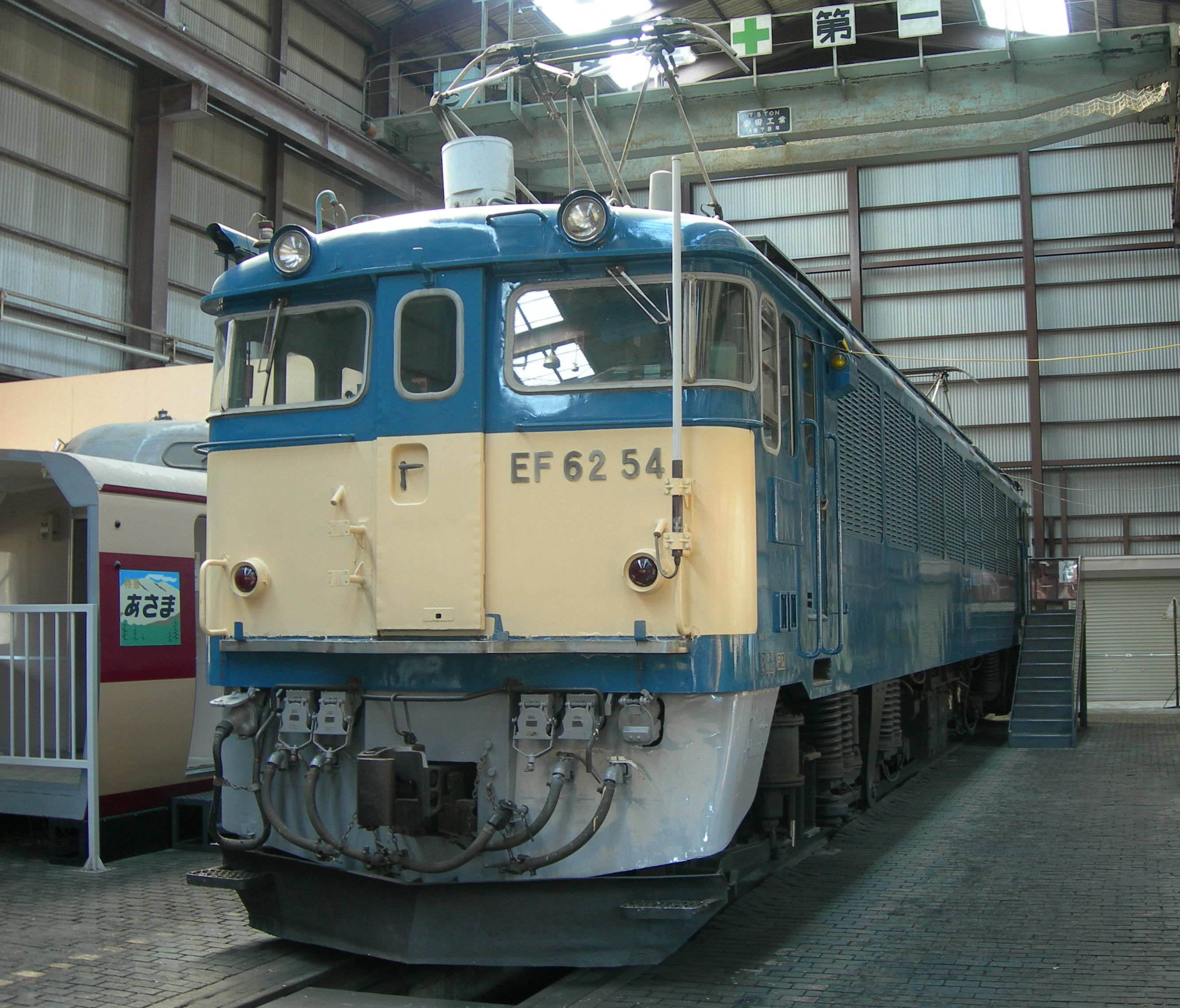
EF62 54 at the Usui Pass Railway Heritage Park, March 2011

== See also ==
- Japan Railways locomotive numbering and classification
