= Noto (train) =

Japanese seasonal overnight express train service

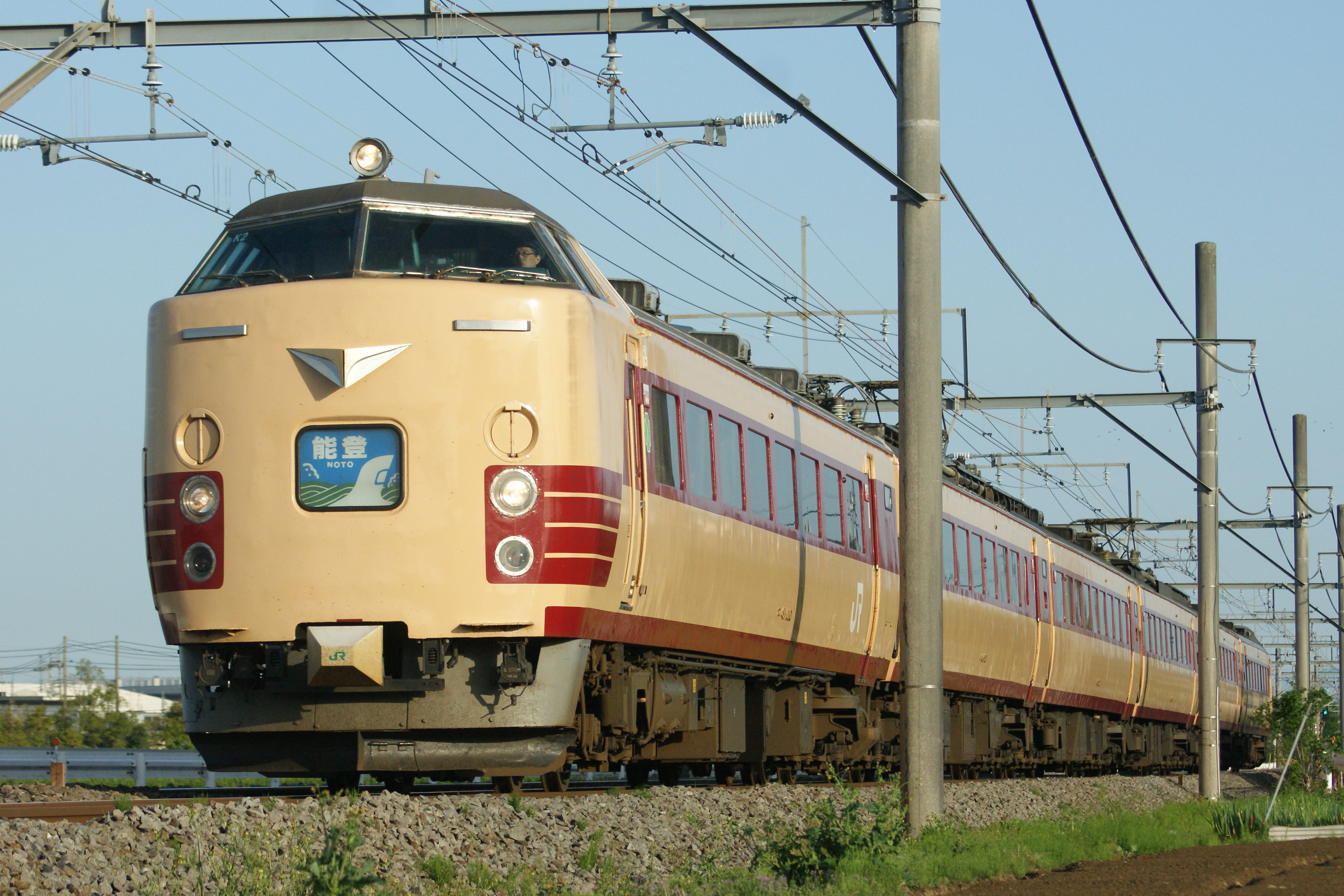
- A seasonal Noto service formed of a JR East 485 series EMU in May 2010

Overview
- Service type: Express
- Status: Discontinued
- Locale: Tōhoku Main Line, Jōetsu Line, Shinetsu Main Line, Hokuriku Main Line
- First service: 22 September 1959
- Last service: 2012
- Former operators: JNR (1959–1987); JR West (1987–2010); JR East (2010–2012)

Route
- Termini: Ueno; Kanazawa
- Service frequency: 1 return working daily (seasonal)

On-board services
- Class: Green/standard

Technical
- Rolling stock: 485 series EMUs
- Track gauge: 1,067 mm (3 ft 6 in)
- Electrification: 1,500 V DC overhead
- Operating speed: 120 km/h (75 mph)

The Noto (能登) was a seasonal overnight express train service in Japan operated by East Japan Railway Company (JR East), which runs between Ueno Station in Tokyo and Kanazawa via the Shinetsu Main Line and Hokuriku Main Line. The journey takes approximately seven hours. The train was operated as a regular daily service by West Japan Railway Company (JR West) until 13 March 2010, with operations transferred to JR East from this date. While JR East has not formally announced its discontinuation, no services have operated since February 2012.

== Rolling stock ==
Trains were formed of 6-car 485 series electric multiple units (EMU) owned by JR East and based at Niigata depot. All seats are reserved.

=== Formation ===
The 6-car 485 series sets based at Niigata are formed as follows, with car 1 at the Ueno and Kanazawa end (trains reverse en route at Nagaoka).

Car No.	1		2	3	4	5	6
Numbering	KuRoHa 481		MoHa 484	MoHa 485	MoHa 484	MoHa 485	KuHa 481
Accommodation	Green	Reserved	Reserved	Reserved	Reserved	Reserved	Reserved
Facilities		Toilet	Toilet	Toilet	Toilet	Phone / Toilet	Toilet

=== Past rolling stock ===
From 1982 onward, services were formed of eight 14 series coaches, consisting of three B-type 3-level berth sleeping cars and five seating coaches. These services were hauled by a Tabata-based JNR Class EF62 electric locomotive between Ueno and Naoetsu, and by a Nagaoka-based JNR Class EF81 electric locomotive between Naoetsu and Kanazawa.

From March 1993, the locomotive-hauled trains were replaced by 9-car JR West 489 series EMUs based at Kanazawa depot, formed as shown below.

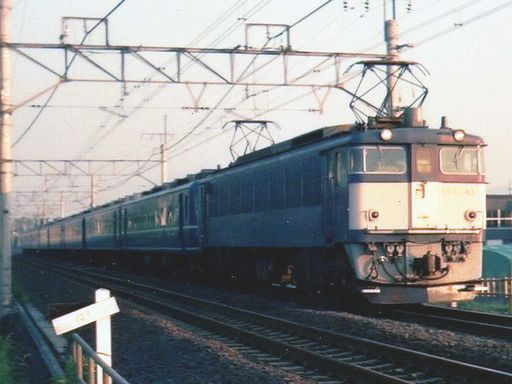
Noto express hauled by EF62 electric locomotive in 1989

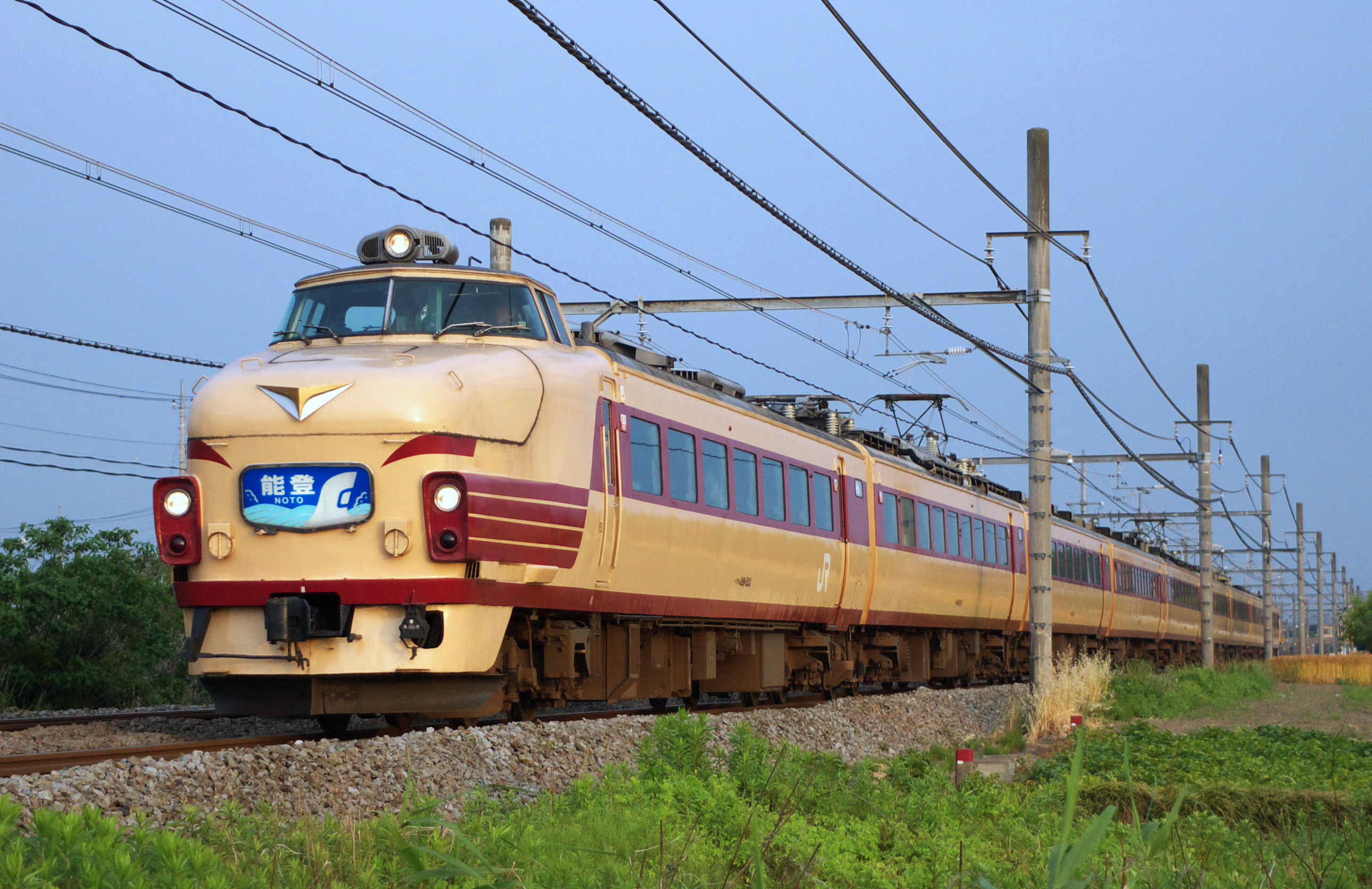
Noto service formed of JR West "bonnet-style" 489 series EMU in May 2007

Car No.	1	2	3	4	5	6	7	8	9
Numbering	KuHa 489	MoHa 488	MoHa 489	SaRo 489	MoHa 488	MoHa 489	MoHa 488	MoHa 489	KuHa 489
Accommodation	Reserved (Women-only)	Reserved	Reserved	Green	Non-reserved	Non-reserved	Non-reserved	Non-reserved	Non-reserved
Facilities	Toilet	Toilet	Toilet	Phone / Toilet	Toilet	Lounge area	Toilet	Toilet	Toilet

== History ==
The Noto name was first used from 22 September 1959 for express services operating between Tokyo and Kanazawa via Maibara, introduced to supplement the existing Hokuriku services connecting Tokyo and the Hokuriku region. The "down" working departed from Tokyo Station at 20:30, arriving in Kanazawa at 08:44, and the "up" working departed from Kanazawa Station at 18:00, arriving in Tokyo at 06:25. Initially, the trains were formed of seven cars (three sleeping cars and four seating cars), but from 1962, trains were increased to 13-car formations.

Following the opening of the Tokaido Shinkansen between Tokyo and Osaka in October 1964, ridership of the Noto decreased, and from October 1965, Noto services ran in conjunction with Yamato services. The services were discontinued from the start of the 1 October 1968 timetable revision.

The name was resurrected from the start of the timetable revision on 10 March 1975 for use on overnight services between Ueno and Kanazawa via the Joetsu Line, replacing one return Hokuriku working.

From 15 November 1982, following the opening of the Joetsu Shinkansen, Noto services were re-routed via the Shinetsu Main Line, and the ageing rolling stock was replaced with newer 14 series cars.

From 1987, the "down" service was extended to run to Wakura-Onsen on the Nanao Line during busy seasons, using JNR Class DE10 diesel locomotive haulage, but this was discontinued from March 1990.

From October 1997, following the opening of the Nagano Shinkansen and severing of the Shinetsu Main Line at Karuizawa, the Noto services were re-routed via the Joetsu Line.

Regular daily Noto services were discontinued on 13 March 2010. The Noto, however, continued to operate as a "seasonal" service during holiday periods.

== See also ==
- List of named passenger trains of Japan
