= ED73 =

ED73 may refer to:

- JNR Class ED73, a Japanese electric locomotive type
- PKP class ED73, a Polish electric multiple unit train type
