= JNR Class ED74 =

Class of 6 Japanese AC electric locomotives

Class ED74
Type and origin
- Power type: Electric
- Builder: Mitsubishi
- Build date: 1962
- Total produced: 6
Specifications
- Configuration
  - UIC: Bo-Bo
- Gauge: 1,067 mm (3 ft 6 in)
- Bogies: DT129
- Wheel diameter: 1,120 mm (44.09 in)
- Length: 14,300 mm (46 ft 11 in)
- Width: 2,805 mm (9 ft 2 3/8 in)
- Height: 4,260 mm (13 ft 11 3/4 in)
- Loco weight: 65.0 t (64.0 long tons; 71.7 short tons)
- Electric system/s: 20 kV AC at 50/60 Hz overhead wire
- Current pickup(s): Pantograph
- Traction motors: MT52
Performance figures
- Power output: 1,900 kW (2,500 hp)
Career
- Operators: JNR
- Number in class: 6
- Numbers: ED74 1–6
- Delivered: 1962
- First run: 1962
- Retired: 1982
- Preserved: 0
- Scrapped: 1982
- Disposition: All withdrawn and scrapped in 1982

The Class ED74 (ED74形) was a Bo-Bo wheel arrangement AC electric locomotive type operated by Japanese National Railways (JNR) in Japan between 1962 and the 1980s.

== Design ==
The Class ED74 was developed as a four-axle version of the six-axle (Bo-Bo-Bo) Class EF70 electric locomotives introduced a year earlier on the Hokuriku Main Line, and was intended for use on services north of Fukui where the gradients were easier.

== History ==
A total of six locomotives were built by Mitsubishi in 1962, coinciding with the electrification of the Hokuriku Main Line between Fukui and Kanazawa. The six locomotives were delivered to Tsuruga Depot.

Displaced by the arrival of Class EF81 multi-voltage AC/DC electric locomotives, the Class EF74 locomotives were transferred to Kyushu in October 1968 for use on the recently electrified Nippo Main Line. To enable use alongside the six axle (Bo-2-Bo) Class ED76 AC locomotives, a dead weight of 1.4 t was added to increase the axle load from 16.25 t to 16.8 t. As the Class EF74 locomotives did not have steam generators and were unable to provide train heating for passenger services, they were mostly used on freight services between Moji and Oita, as well as on overnight sleeping car services that did not require a separate heating supply from the locomotive. Despite electrification south to Miyazaki in 1974, the Class EF74 locomotives were not allowed south of Oita due to their axle load, and were subsequently replaced by an additional build of Class ED76 locomotives. The entire class was withdrawn by 1982.

== Classification ==
The ED74 classification for this locomotive type is explained below.

- E: Electric locomotive
- D: Four driving axles
- 7x: AC locomotive with maximum speed exceeding 85 km/h (55 mph)
