= Rail Wars! =

Japanese light novel series

- First light novel volume cover featuring the character Aoi Sakurai

RAIL WARS! -日本國有鉄道公安隊- (Rēru Wōzu! Nihon Kokuyū Tetsudō Kōantai)
- Genre: Action
- Light novel
- Written by: Takumi Toyoda
- Illustrated by: Vania 600
- Published by: Sohgeisha (1–13); Jitsugyo no Nihon Sha (14–20)
- Imprint: Sohgeisha Clear Bunko (1–13); J Novel Light Bunko (14–20)
- Original run: January 16, 2012 – December 14, 2020
- Volumes: 20
- Manga

Rail Wars! Nihon Kokuyū Tetsudō Kōantai The Revolver
- Written by: Takumi Toyoda
- Illustrated by: Keiji Asakawa
- Published by: Mag Garden
- Imprint: Blade Comics
- Magazine: Blade Online
- Original run: 2012 – 2015
- Volumes: 3
- Anime television series
- Directed by: Yoshifumi Sueda
- Produced by: Hiroyuki Tajima; Hiroyuki Yamamoto; Jun Fukuda; Junichiro Tanaka; Kenichiro Sakai; Takeshi Ishigaki; Tatsuya Ishiguro; Terushige Yoshie
- Written by: Masashi Suzuki
- Music by: Yoshiaki Fujisawa
- Studio: Passione
- Licensed by: AUS: Hanabee; NA: Sentai Filmworks
- Original network: TBS, SUN, CBC, BS-TBS
- Original run: July 4, 2014 – September 19, 2014
- Episodes: 12
- Light novel

Rail Wars! A
- Written by: Takumi Toyoda
- Illustrated by: Daito
- Published by: Jitsugyo no Nihon Sha
- Imprint: J Novel Light Bunko
- Original run: March 12, 2021 – present
- Volumes: 2
- Light novel

Rail Wars! Exp
- Written by: Takumi Toyoda
- Illustrated by: Vania 600
- Published by: Jitsugyo no Nihon Sha
- Imprint: J Novel Light Bunko
- Original run: November 8, 2021 – present
- Volumes: 2
- icon

Rail Wars! (Japanese: RAIL WARS! -日本國有鉄道公安隊-, Hepburn: Rēru Wōzu! Nihon Kokuyū Tetsudō Kōantai; lit. 'Rail Wars! Japanese National Railways Security Force') is a Japanese light novel series written by Takumi Toyoda with illustrations by Vania 600. 13 volumes have been published by Sohgeisha under their Sohgeisha Clear Bunko imprint; the series moved to Jitsugyo no Nihon Sha starting with the 14th volume; the 20th and last volume of the original series was published in December 2020.

A side story book with an added character was first published on November 8, 2021. There is a new series with a different main character and a new illustrator, first printed in March 2021. The second new volume came out on January 20, 2022.

A manga adaptation titled Rail Wars! Nihon Kokuyū Tetsudō Kōantai The Revolver was serialized in Mag Garden's Blade Online from 2012 to 2015. An anime television series adaptation aired between July and September 2014.

== Plot ==
The series takes place in an alternate version of Japan where the nationalized railway system was never privatized (in real life, the Japanese National Railways were privatized in 1987). Naoto Takayama is an ordinary high school student who aspires to a comfortable life working on the Japanese National Railways. He ends up working as a security force trainee, where he unwillingly has to deal with his strange colleagues as well as RJ, a group of extremists who are fighting to privatize the railway.

== Characters ==
Naoto Takayama (高山 直人, Takayama Naoto)
Voiced by: Jun Fukuyama
While originally, he wanted a peaceful life as a driver, he ended up as the leader of the Fourth Guard Squad. He is a big train fan, and he is very knowledgeable about all types and models. When he was young, he nearly fainted from gastritis, after he took a picture of a passing train. He rarely takes risks but listens to everyone during a crisis.
Aoi Sakurai (桜井 あおい, Sakurai Aoi)
Voiced by: Manami Numakura
She is the most fight-ready member of her team. She is very athletic and it is later revealed that she has hidden feelings for Naoto but refuses to show it. Her father is a police officer and that greatly influenced her, to the point that she cannot differentiate between her job and the police. She is the only one who pushes Naoto to do his best.
Haruka Kōmi (小海 はるか, Kōmi Haruka)
Voiced by: Maaya Uchida
A girl with a sweet demeanor. While she is not very physically strong, she has a good memory and enjoys studying. She has had a crush on Naoto since the time he saved her when she got lost in the railroad museum during their childhood.
Shō Iwaizumi (岩泉 翔, Iwaizumi Shō)
Voiced by: Satoshi Hino
The most easy going and physically fit member of the team. He always wears a yellow stab vest. He seems to have a massive appetite because he exercises efficiently.
Nana Iida (飯田 奈々, Iida Nana)
Voiced by: Yui Horie
Originally the leader of the Fourth Guard Squad, but after seeing Naoto's leadership skills, she resigns her position as leader and temporarily gives it to him. She has a cheerful personality and treats her subordinates kindly and equally, but can also be mischievous.
Mari Sasshō (札沼 まり, Sasshō Mari)
Voiced by: Hiromi Igarashi
A friend of Naoto from school who joins the OJT a month after him. She has excellent hearing and enjoys listening to the sounds of trains. In the light novels, she seems to gain an interest in Shō after he rescues her, whilst in the anime, she seems to know a lot about Naoto and has a crush on him. She works as a waitress at the train station's restaurant usually frequented by the Fourth Guard Squad.
Hitomi Gonō (五能 瞳, Gonō Hitomi)
Voiced by: Mai Nakahara
The instructor and commander of the Tokyo Security Force's mobile units. Despite being sometimes harsh, she deeply cares for the safety of the passengers. She is close friends with Nana.
Noa Kashima (鹿島乃亜, Kashima Noa)
Voiced by: Minori Chihara
A recently popular idol. She is the diva of the idol unit unoB, as well as writing the lyrics and composing the songs for the unit. In the anime, she develops a crush on Naoto after he saves her from a crazed man during a concert.

== Media ==
=== Light novels ===
Rail Wars! began as a light novel series written by Takumi Toyoda, with illustrations by Vania 600. The first novel was published by Sohgeisha on January 16, 2012, under their Sohgeisha Clear Bunko imprint, and the last volume 20 of the original series was released on December 14, 2020.

No.	Release date	ISBN
1	January 16, 2012	978-4-88144-150-3
2	May 15, 2012	978-4-88144-159-6
3	September 15, 2012	978-4-88144-167-1
4	November 15, 2012	978-4-88144-169-5
5	February 15, 2013	978-4-88144-173-2
6	May 15, 2013	978-4-88144-179-4
7	September 19, 2013	978-4-88144-182-4
8	January 31, 2014	978-4-88144-188-6
9	June 20, 2014	978-4-88144-192-3
10	December 25, 2014	978-4-88144-201-2
11	July 11, 2015	978-4-88144-210-4
12	December 24, 2015	978-4-88144-216-6
13	August 3, 2016	978-4-88144-220-3
14	December 15, 2017	978-4-408-55401-3
15	July 31, 2018	978-4-408-55436-5
16	December 14, 2018	978-4-408-55456-3
17	July 19, 2019	978-4-408-55488-4
18	December 13, 2019	978-4-408-55559-1
19	July 10, 2020	978-4-408-55602-4
20	December 14, 2020	978-4-408-55640-6

==== New Light novels ====
Another series, titled Rail Wars! A, introducing the main character of Daisuke Sakai was published in March 2021. The illustrator for this series is Daito. The second volume came out on January 20, 2022.

No.	Release date	ISBN
1	March 12, 2021	978-4-408-55650-5
2	January 20, 2022	978-4-408-55709-0

==== Light novel - side story ====
A side story book called Exp Keishi ☆ Tropical Front! was published in early November 2021 and introduced the character of Yasushi Yasukuni. It takes place at the same time as the main series and is located on the Sagami Bay coast of Izu at Atami. The second side story was published in July 2022 and has to do with an AI discovered on a laptop in the Tokyo station lost and found.

No.	Release date	ISBN
1	November 8, 2021	978-4-408-55675-8
2	July 21, 2022	978-4-408-55739-7

=== Manga ===
A manga adaptation, titled Rail Wars! Nihon Kokuyū Tetsudō Kōantai The Revolver (RAIL WARS! -日本國有鉄道公安隊- The Revolver) and illustrated by Keiji Asakawa, began serialization in Mag Garden's Blade Online magazine on 2012.

=== Anime ===
An anime television series adaptation animated by Passione aired on TBS from July 3, 2014, to September 19, 2014. The opening theme is titled "Mukai Kaze ni Utarenagara" (向かい風に打たれながら) and is sung by Minori Chihara. The ending theme is titled OVERDRIVER and is sung by ZAQ. The anime has been licensed by Sentai Filmworks.

No.	Title	Original release date
1	"Welcome to K4!" "Ke-yon e yōkoso!" (けーよんへようこそ！)	July 4, 2014
Naoto Takayama is on his way to enroll in Japan's National Railway Central Academy (JNRC). Along the way, he encounters two classmates, Aoi Sakurai and Haruka Kōmi. He befriends them and they form a group with Shō Iwaizumi, another classmate. They participate in various activities including shooting practice. One of the tests is coal shovelling a C62 steam locomotive engine. The four are the only group to pass and succeed in attaining a speed of 100 km/h by shovelling less in the middle of the coal engine. During their final training on-site, they band together as a group and succeed in catching a pair of thieves, despite the threat from an old security officer. They are all granted participation rights to the OJT (On Job Training).
2	"Just Let Me for a Little" "Chotto dake kōsasete" (ちょっとだけこうさせて)	July 11, 2014
Takayama and his friends are assigned to the Public Safety Force (PSF) under the care of the Fourth Peacekeeper Squad Leader, Nana Iida. They observe as the PSF squad is deployed as a bomb is supposedly planted in the Yokohama Station. The four are assigned to keep guard and help at the Tokyo station, much to Sakurai's disappointment. The perpetrator notifies the defense force that actually the real target is the Tokyo station. They want ¥100 million in exchange for the disclosure of the bomb's location. Takayama and his friends are given the chance to search for the bomb before it goes off at three. They search the lockers without success. Sakurai suggests they search in the place they would least expect; it was underneath the dog carrier at the lost and found centre. They close off the area and Sakurai attempts to defuse the bomb with Takayama's help. Sakurai uses the liquid nitrogen from a restaurant to freeze the bomb's circuit with five seconds remaining. The perpetrator is arrested and Takayama is assigned to be the acting team leader.
3	"Pretty Cool!" "Kakko yokatta yo!" (カッコよかったよ！)	July 18, 2014
Takayama's friend, Mari Sasshō, works in a restaurant near the defense headquarters. While eating lunch, she serves them and is introduced to everyone. She will also be attending the same academy. The next day, Sasshō's friend Kaori goes missing and she requests the Defense Four's help finding her. They go through reports to no success and Sasshō ends up hearing Kaori's phone ringtone in the lost and found. She listens to an audio recording on the phone and hears the sound of waves and specifics to a certain station with her excellent hearing. They search through warehouses along the line and find her tied up as the witness of a crime scene. They take down the criminals and take Kaori to the hospital.
4	"I Think I Like It" "Kiniitchatta kamo ne" (気に入っちゃったかもね)	July 25, 2014
The Defense Four are assigned as the JNR idol Noa Kashima's guards during a performance on the beach. After guarding her from a fan at the station, Takayama faints. As thanks, Kashima gives him her stamp collection book. During a practice session, flash paper is burnt as a threat to Kashima's performance. The following day, during the performance, the criminal, disguised as a member of staff, attempts to run on stage and stab Kashima. Thanks to Iida's quick thinking, they manage to play it off as a performance. Takayama gets stabbed but is saved by the stamp book in his chest pocket. In the end, it seems that Kashima develops romantic feelings towards Takayama.
5	"Quit Staring" "Miru n janai wa yo" (見るんじゃないわよ)	August 1, 2014
After Takayama's morning shooting practice with Sakurai, the Defense Four (Takayama, Sakurai, Iwaizumi and Haruka) are tasked with finding the Tokyo station bomber's accomplice. Takayama and Sakurai find and pursue him, waiting for backup from the public safety force (PSF). They lose him after he exits the train and runs into a forest and end up spending the night at a station together. Thanks to this, Takayama misses a trip he was planning. In the morning, they find the bomber attempting to board a train at the station. The bomber leaves behind a bomb on the tracks and gets away again. Takayama has Sakurai shoot the rock fall sensors to signal an approaching train. The criminal is later caught by the PSF and they arrive back safely. Sakurai insists on giving Takayama more training, despite Haruka protesting that he is just being nice.
6	"I'll Protect You" "Watashi ga mamotte miserukara" (わたしが守ってみせるから)	August 8, 2014
The Defense Four are detained to their homes for a week due to the events of the previous episode. Takayama receives a letter with the text "Today could be your last day." Takayama calls Sakurai, but gets no answer. He calls Haruka instead. Sakurai spots Haruka on the way to meet Takayama in Akihabara. They are interrupted by a JNR mascot, Tsubarail and move to a different location. Haruka calls Sakurai but a gust of wind causes her to drop her cell phone. Sakurai spots them again while walking out of the phone repair shop. She is about to shoots Takayama out of jealousy when the JNR mascot, Tsubarail accidentally bumps into her. Haruka and Takayama mistake this for a sniper and continues to run away, while Sakurai has also been tailed by a police officer for shooting a gun in public. Takayama stumbles and falls on top of Haruka after climbing a fence. They fall on a supply of cat food and are later surrounded by cats. Sakurai finds remains of Haruka's clothes and phone and tracks them down. Takayama and Haruka seek refuge in the Transportation Museum. Iida and Gonō find Sakurai out on the streets, but they are interrupted as Gonō receives a call that the alarm system at the Transportation Museum was tripped. Thieves also seem to have broken into the Transportation Museum, but they are stopped by Sakurai and Gono. Takayama gets punched from Sakurai for stripping Haruka naked. It is revealed that Takayama and Haruka met eight years ago in the museum when she was trapped in a closet. Takayama came to her rescue then. After the thieves are taken care of, they find out that the letter was just an advertisement for JNR Life Insurance.
7	"You Look Good in That" "Niatteta to omoukedo na" (似合ってたと思うけどな)	August 15, 2014
The K4 members head to Karuizawa for Advanced Railway Security Force Training. Naoto is excited to hear that they'll have a course on operating an EF63 electric locomotive; but instead, the instruction is on the EF63's predecessor, the ED42. Aoi accompanies him in shooting lessons and strength training, saying she does not want him to slow her down as they'll be working in railway security together, but Naoto tells her that his true intention is to be a train operator, causing their relationship to break down. Aoi apologizes through a note later after the team failed to work together on the train simulator. Naoto, Haruka, Sakurai all grouped up at the church by Noa.
8	"I'll Deliver" "Watashi ga todokemasu" (わたしが届けます)	August 22, 2014
Misunderstandings further threaten the harmony among the K4 members. Even the weather is on a rampage, causing a landslide near Karuizawa. Meanwhile, an employee of the Japanese Organs Transit System tells station attendants that she must get an organ to the hospital in Maebashi as quickly as possible for a transplant operation, but both railways and roads are closed due to the heavy rains leaving the K4 members to make the journey in an EB42 draisine. Everyone makes amends and decides to help her together after Haruka volunteers for the job, allowing Naoto's dream to come true as a train operator.
9	"Thanks" "Arigatō" (ありがとう)	August 29, 2014
K4 head toward Yokokawa as the rain plummets down. Haruka says the track from Usui Bridge No. 3 to Yokokawa should be safe since it is regularly maintained for the opening of the Usui Abt Railway, but the old track makes the journey challenging. Everyone is forced to their skills and tools on the small train to succeed. In the end, the package made it safely despite the velocipede falling apart. Their improved teamwork on the train help gave them a pass.
10	"Could it be Our Little Secret?" "Himitsu ni shite kureru" (ヒミツにしてくれる?)	September 5, 2014
Prince Bernina has arrived in Japan to attend a ceremony in Sapporo, and the K4 members are appointed to guard him on the way there. Naoto and the others are about to board Hokutosei 3 at Ueno Station when Aoi contacts Naoto and tells him she is pursuing a suspicious man who was watching the platform. Bernina is revealed to be a girl. Naoto and Bernina are close to danger when Aoi came to the rescue at the last moment while Iwaizumi is busy with the other henchman.
11	"I'll Go With You" "Tsukiatte ageruwa yo" (つきあってあげるわよ)	September 12, 2014
Naoto, Iwaizumi and Aoi managed to fight off their attackers on the Hokutosei, but while on the run, Naoto and Bernina find themselves under attack again. This time it is Aoi who saves them from being tasered and Iwaizumi who tasered the henchmen back. Just as he breathes a sigh of relief, Naoto's phone rings. The man wants an exchange on the front of a diesel train, accompanied by Aoi. Naoto decides to dress up as Bernina to save Haruka on another train. After a brief fight, both engines cannot stop because of the engines being shot by guns. Naoto and Aoi disconnects the passengers train and have a brief moment to themselves. Gono and the team come to save the two.
12	"Everyone's Waiting" "Minna matteru yo" (みんな待ってるよ)	September 19, 2014
After seeing the others back to Tokyo while they cleaned up the aftermath of the Hokutosei incident, Naoto and Iida wait at Aomori Station for the Hatsukari service. The engine that will pull their train to Tokyo is the KiHa 381, equipped with a pendulum-style, diesel-fueled gas turbine engine. Shortly after they depart, Naoto hears a strange sound and cannot shake the feeling that something is not right. Despite, the many mishaps with the air conditioner and the chief conductor that turns out to be a girl, all his friends decide to celebrate at Naoto's home at the end, with the ending of the train incident left up in a mystery.

=== Video game ===
An adventure game developed by 5pb. for the PlayStation Vita was announced that was originally due for a November 27, 2014, release, until it was delayed.

On January 28, 2016, 5pb. and Mages. Inc. announced that the PlayStation Vita game was cancelled due to the game's development falling behind schedule and other "various circumstances".

== Reception ==
Jacob Chapman from Anime News Network heavily panned Rail Wars! for being "pure fantasy and not even exciting fantasy" with its alternate version of the Japanese National Railway system, "fanatical infatuation" with Japanese train history and embarrassing fanservice innovation, calling it "a show fueled by uninteresting trivia, buffeted by desperate attempts at sex appeal and action-movie excitement on a shoe-string budget." By the series' end, he concluded that: "If you're a train and fanservice aficionado and have missed the ride so far, you might as well check it out now before it's completely (and deservedly) forgotten by the world."
