= JNR Class EF63 =

Japanese electric locomotive type

Class EF63
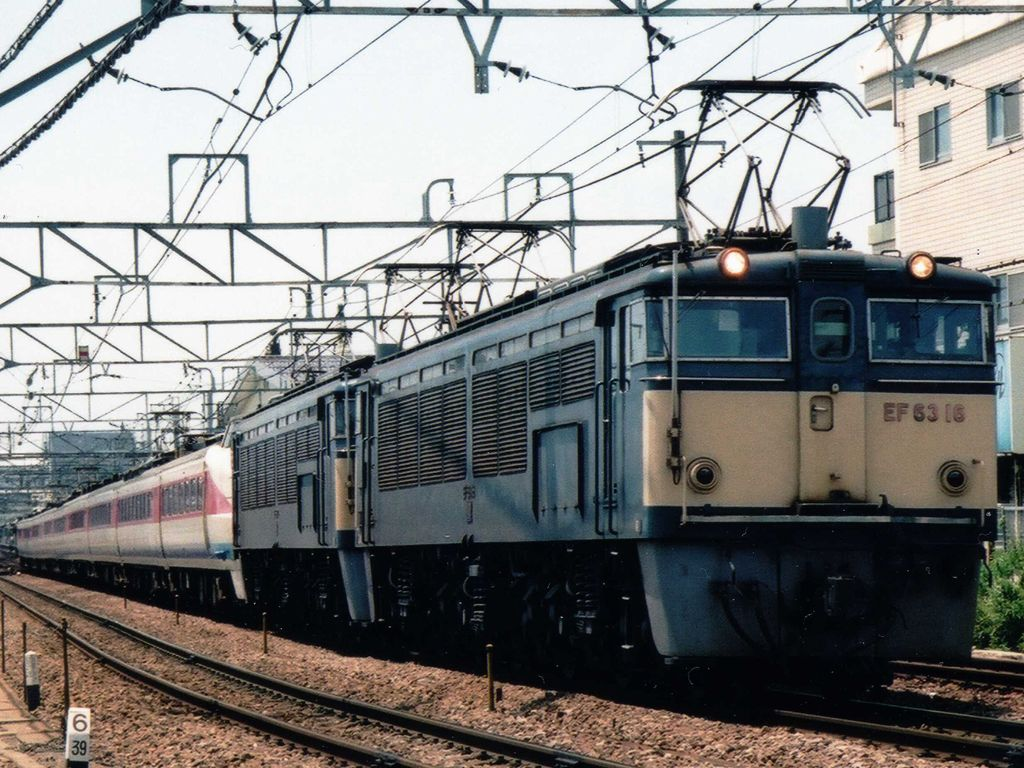
- A pair of EF63s leading a 489 series EMU on a Hakusan service in June 1997
Type and origin
- Power type: Electric
- Builder: Kawasaki, Mitsubishi and Tōshiba
- Build date: 1962–1976
Specifications
- Configuration
  - UIC: Bo-Bo-Bo
- Gauge: 1,067 mm (3 ft 6 in)
- Wheel diameter: 1,120 mm (44.09 in)
- Length: 18,050 mm (59 ft 2 5/8 in)
- Width: 2,800 mm (9 ft 2 1/4 in)
- Height: 4,060 mm (13 ft 3 7/8 in)
- Loco weight: 108 t (106 long tons; 119 short tons)
- Electric system/s: 1,500 V DC overhead lines
- Current pickup: Pantograph
- Traction motors: DC
Performance figures
- Maximum speed: 100 km/h (62 mph)
- Power output: 2.55 MW (3,420 hp)
- Tractive effort: 23,400 kgf (229,476 N; 51,588 lbf)
Career
- Operators: JNR, JR East, JR Freight
- Number in class: 25
- First run: 1 October 1963
- Withdrawn: 30 September 1997
- Disposition: All withdrawn

The Class EF63 (EF63形) is a class of 1,500 V DC electric locomotives formerly operating in Japan.

== History ==
A total of 25 Class EF63 locomotives were built between 1962 and 1976 exclusively for use as bankers (U.S. "helpers" or "pushers") on the steeply-graded Usui Pass section of the Shinetsu Main Line between Yokokawa and Karuizawa. They replaced the Class ED42 electric locomotives previously used on the rack-and-pinion line between these two stations.

The prototype, EF63 1, was produced in 1962 by Toshiba for testing before full production of the class started in 1963 spread between manufacturers Kawasaki, Mitsubishi and Toshiba. The class was equipped with a number of special safety features to cope with the unique conditions of operating on the 66.7‰, 6.67 % gradient of the Usui Pass. These included independent dynamic brakes on all six axles (hence the large louvres along the bodysides for heat dissipation), magnetic adhesion brakes operating directly on the rails, and mechanical locking brakes. Small wheels attached to the centre bogie were used to measure the train speed and apply the brakes in the case of run-away. The class used the same 425 kW MT52 traction motors used on the EF62s and also the EF70s. The entire class was based at Yokokawa depot, and they were always used in pairs at the Yokokawa end of trains travelling in both directions, and were capable of operating in multiple with Class EF62 locomotives and a wide range of EMU types (including 115, 185, 189, 489 series) – hence the impressive array of jumper cables and connectors on the Karuizawa ends of the locos. (Note: Their Karuizawa ends had dual coupling, the Yokokawa ends had normal Janney coupling though.) Trains ascending the incline from Yokokawa were driven by the driver in the rearmost cab of the EF63 pair at the rear of the train, with the driver in the front cab of the train acting only as signal look-out.

Locos EF63 5 and EF63 9 were written off after a runaway derailment also involving two EF62s in 1975, and EF63 24 and EF63 25 were additionally built in 1976 to replace these two.

In 1978, EF63 11 and 13 were specially turned out to work an imperial train over the Usui Pass.

Following privatization of JNR, the entire fleet was transferred to JR East operation with the exception of EF63 1 and 14 operated by JR Freight.

The closure of the Yokokawa to Karuizawa section of the Shinetsu Main Line in September 1997 coinciding with the opening of the new Nagano Shinkansen marked the end of the careers of the EF63 locomotives. Before their final withdrawal, however, a number of locos (EF63 18, 19, 24, and 25) were repainted into original brown livery following their last overhauls in 1997. Incidentally, these locomotives were delivered in standard blue livery from new.

== E43000 ==
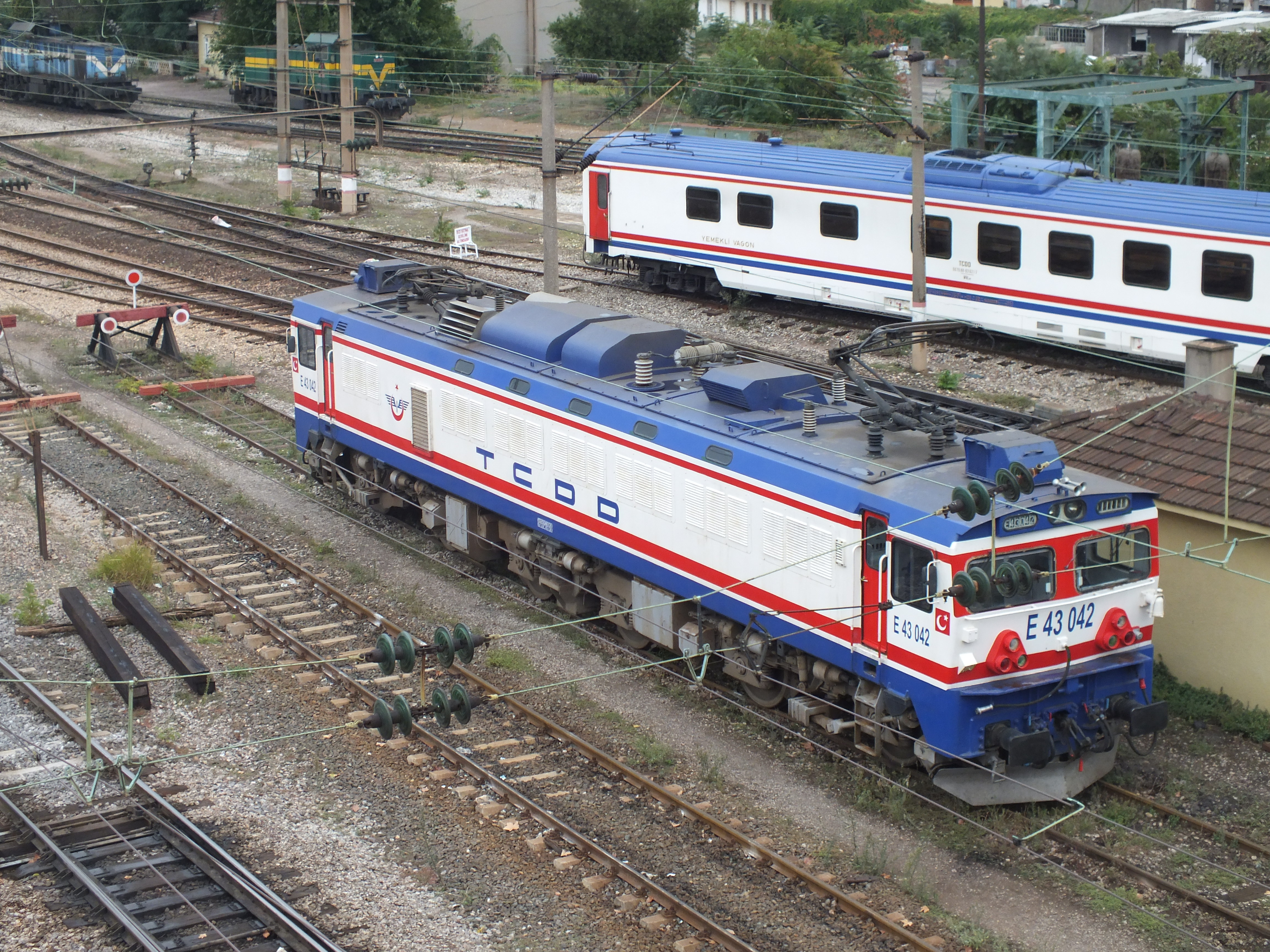
E43000 is a class based on EF63

The TCDD E43000 is a twin-cab six-axle Bo-Bo-Bo electric locomotive used previously by the Turkish State Railways and currently by TCDD Taşımacılık in Turkey. The locomotives were designed by Toshiba and built by TÜLOMSAŞ at their Eskişehir shops. The locomotive is based on the JNR Class EF63 electric locomotive in Japan, built by Toshiba. The Turkish State Railways ordered 45 locomotives as part of the railways electrification program of the late-1980s early-1990s.

== Locomotive histories ==
No.	Builder	Built	Withdrawn
EF63 1	Toshiba	1962	1984
EF63 2	Toshiba	1963	1998
EF63 3	Toshiba	1963	1998
EF63 4	Toshiba	1963	1998
EF63 5	Toshiba	1963	1975
EF63 6	Toshiba	1963	1998
EF63 7	Mitsubishi	1963	1998
EF63 8	Mitsubishi	1963	1998
EF63 9	Mitsubishi	1963	1975
EF63 10	Mitsubishi	1963	1998
EF63 11	Mitsubishi	1963	1998
EF63 12	Mitsubishi	1963	1998
EF63 13	Mitsubishi	1963	1998
EF63 14	Toshiba	1966	1984
EF63 15	Toshiba	1966	1998
EF63 16	Toshiba	1966	1998
EF63 17	Toshiba	1966	1998
EF63 18	Kawasaki	1967	1998
EF63 19	Mitsubishi	1967	1998
EF63 20	Kawasaki	1969	1998
EF63 21	Kawasaki	1969	1998
EF63 22	Kawasaki	1974	1998
EF63 23	Kawasaki	1974	1998
EF63 24	Kawasaki	1976	1998
EF63 25	Kawasaki	1976	1998

== Batch differences ==
Batch 1:	EF63 2 – EF63 13	Icicle cutters added above cab windscreens, rectangular front skirts
Batch 2:	EF63 14 – EF63 21	Recessed tail lights, lightning protector moved to centre of cab roof
Batch 3:	EF63 22 – EF63 25	Loco numbers affixed in number plate form

== Preserved examples ==
- EF63 1 Usui Pass Railway Heritage Park, Gunma (brown livery)
- EF63 2 Karuizawa Station
- EF63 10 Usui Pass Railway Heritage Park, Gunma
- EF63 11 Usui Pass Railway Heritage Park, Gunma (operational)
- EF63 12 Usui Pass Railway Heritage Park, Gunma (operational)
- EF63 13 Cab section only at Omiya Works
- EF63 15 Nagano depot
- EF63 18 Usui Pass Railway Heritage Park, Gunma (brown livery)
- EF63 19 Nagano depot (brown livery)
- EF63 22 Privately preserved
- EF63 24 Usui Pass Railway Heritage Park, Gunma (operational)
- EF63 25 Usui Pass Railway Heritage Park, Gunma (operational)

EF63 24 and 25 are currently used to provide driver training sessions to members of the public at the Usui Pass Railway Heritage Park on a short stretch of track electrified at 750 V DC (rather than the normal 1,500 V). EF63 11 and 12 are kept as operational spares. All other preserved examples are kept as static exhibits.

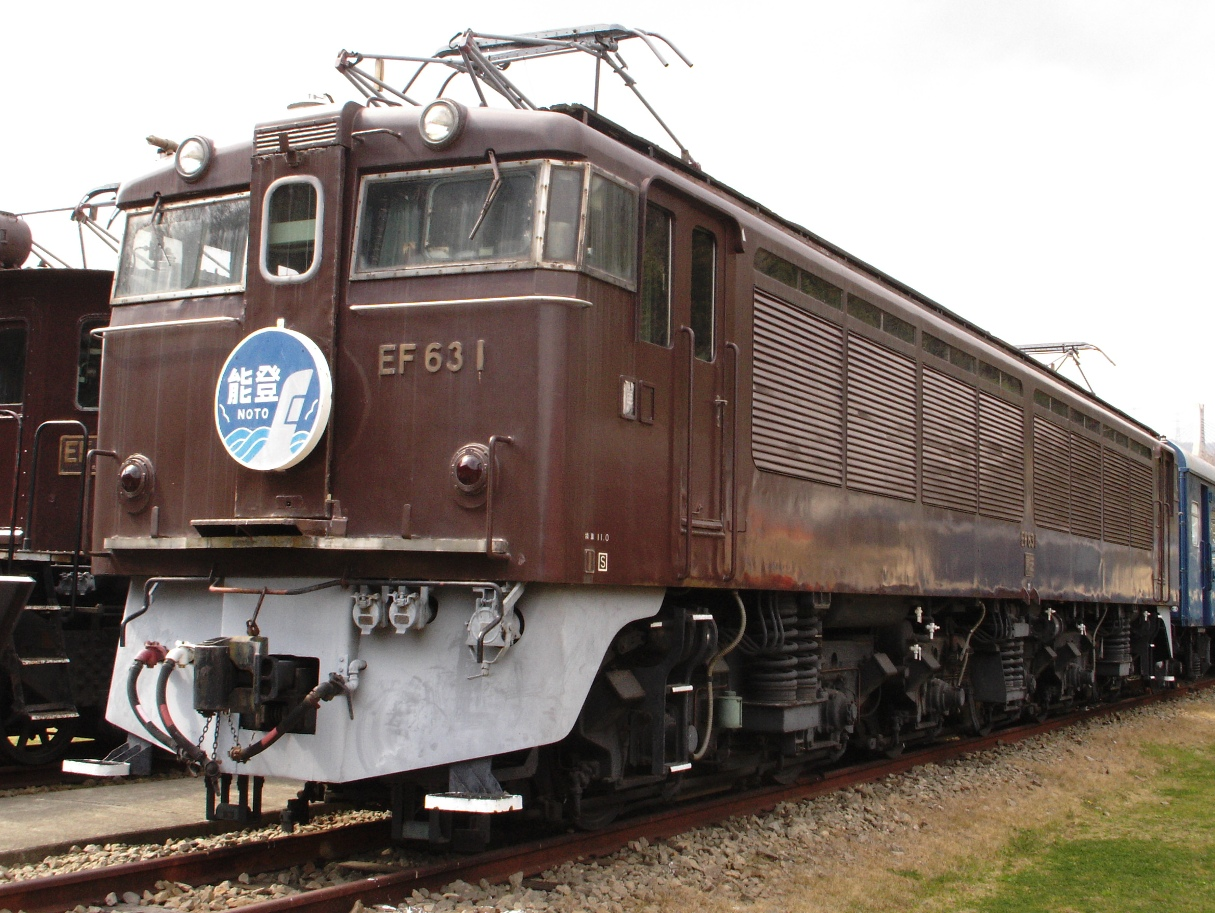
EF63 1 preserved at Usui Pass Railway Heritage Park in brown livery

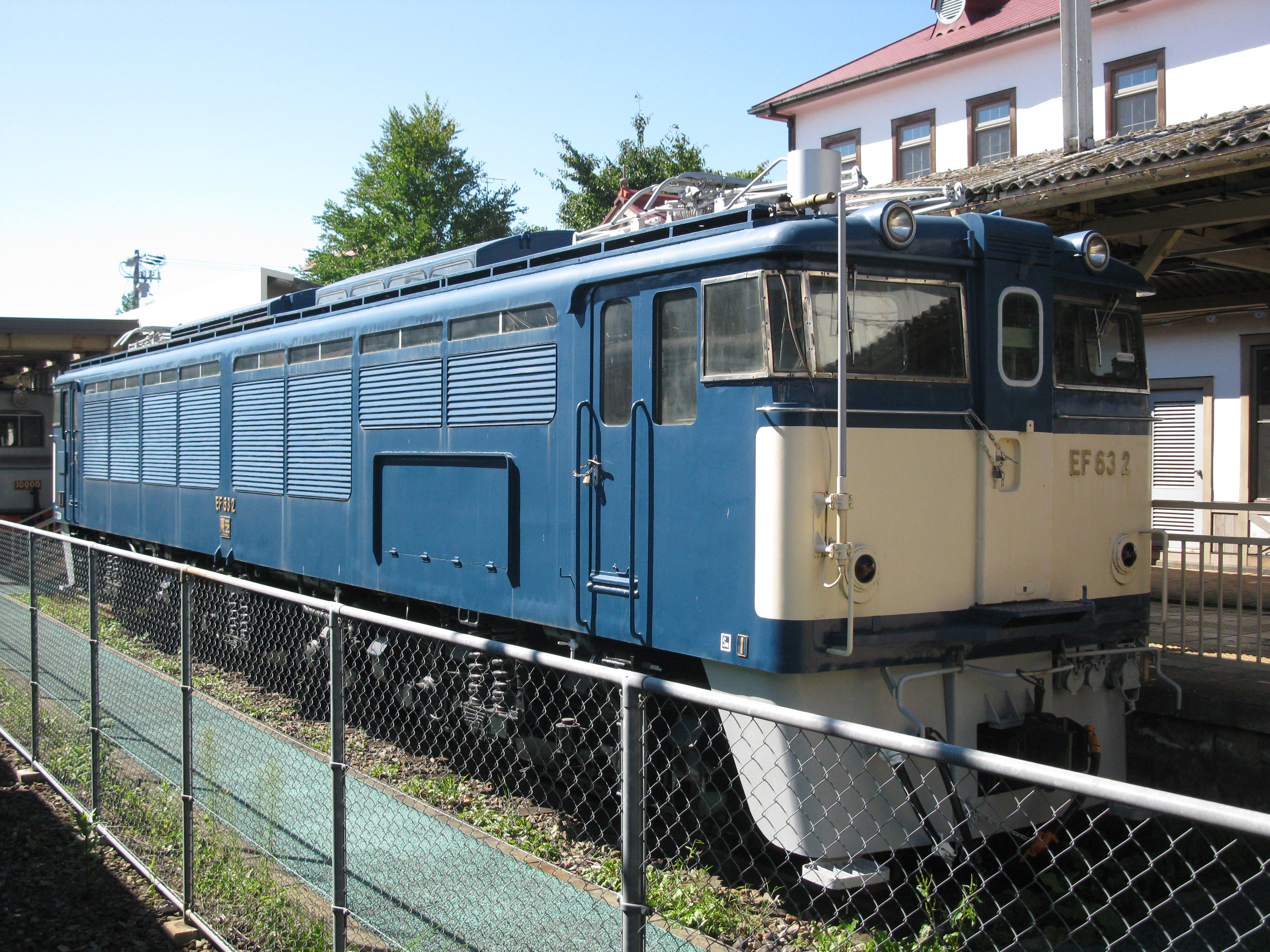
EF63 2 preserved at Karuizawa Station, September 2011

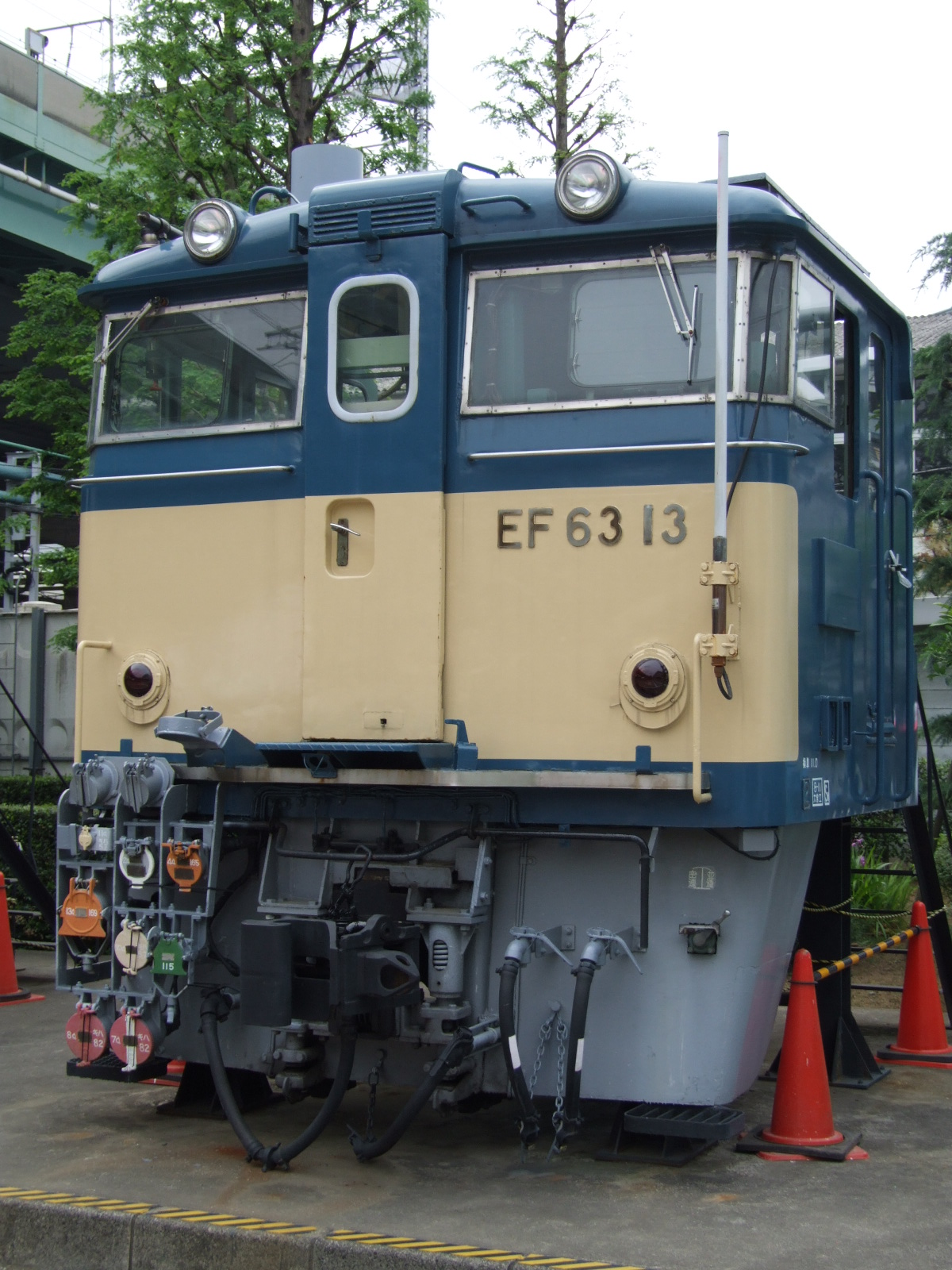
The cab section of EF63 13

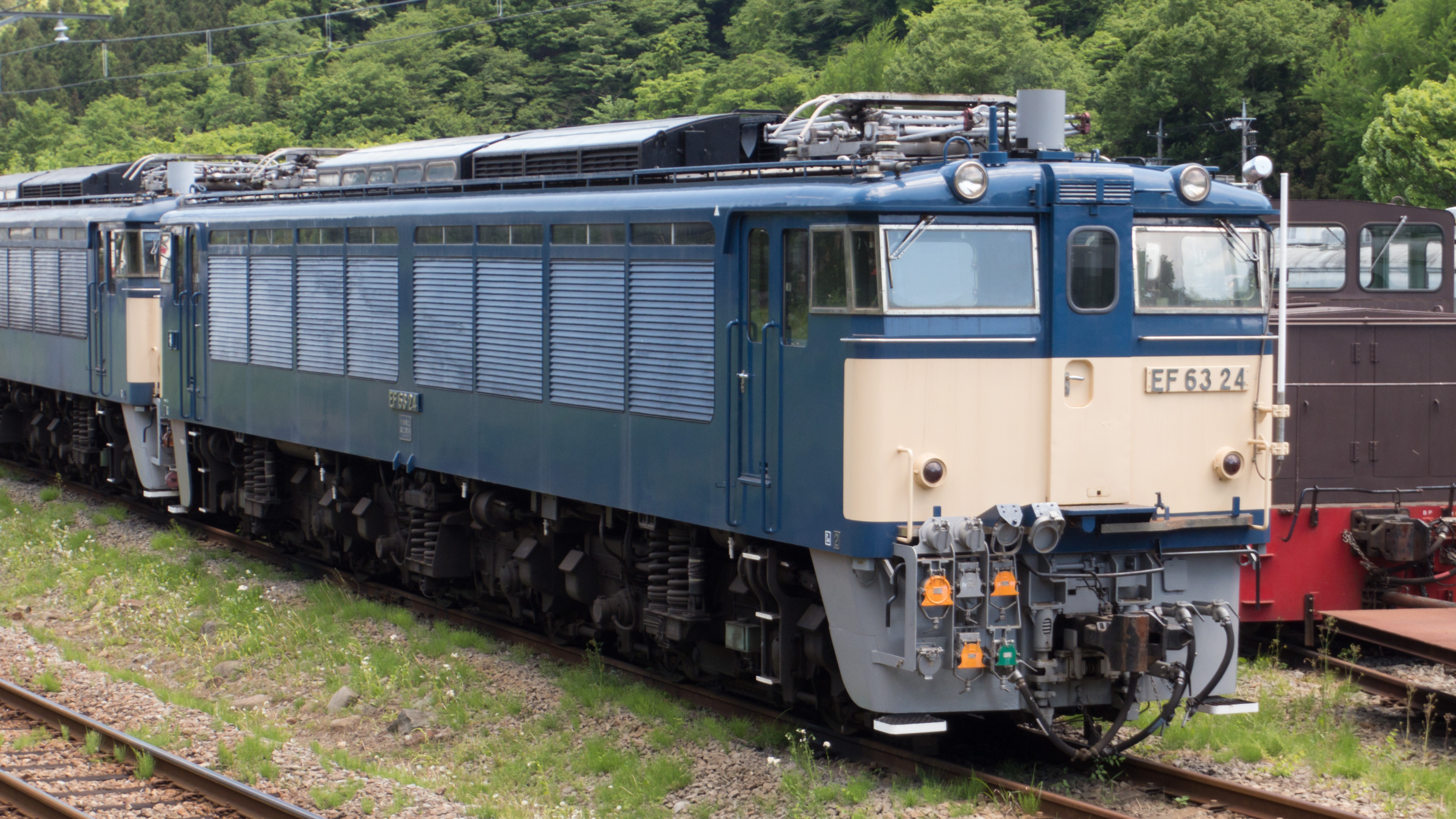
EF63 24 at the Usui Pass Railway Heritage Park, May 2014

== See also ==
- Japan Railways locomotive numbering and classification
