= Usui Pass =

Mountain pass in Japan

Coordinates: 36.3446°N 138.6507°E

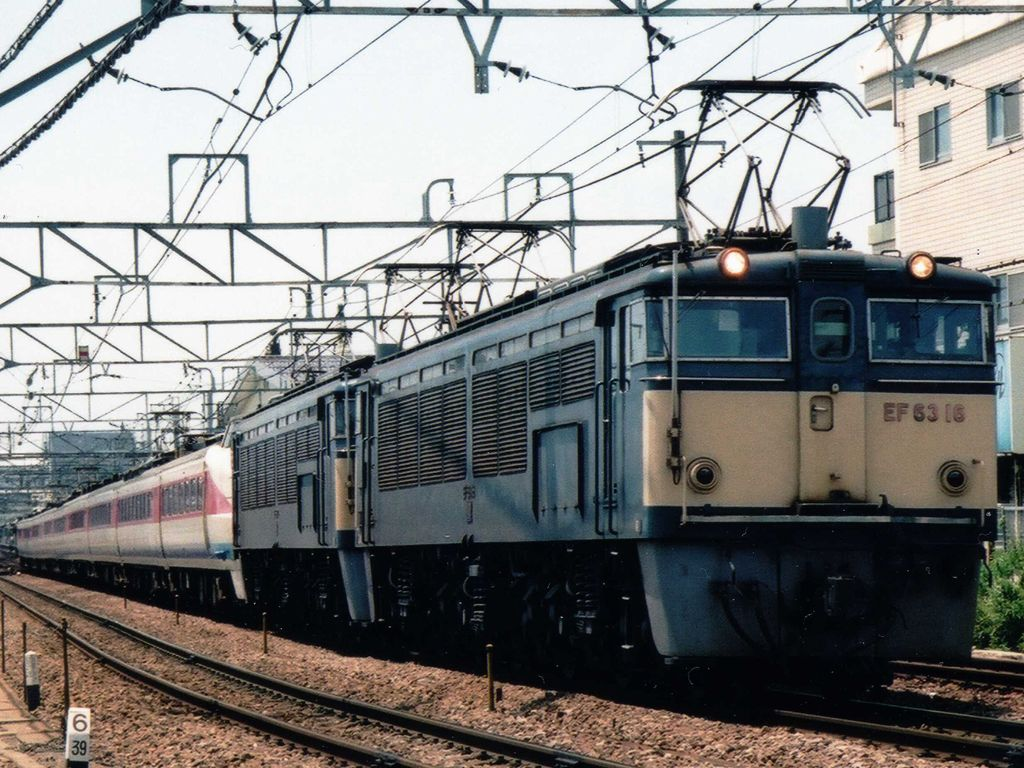
A 489 series with JNR Class EF63 helper engines, 1997

The Usui pass (碓氷峠, / Usui-tōge) is a mountain pass that lies between Nagano and Gunma Prefecture in Japan. It has served as one of the major transportation routes in central Japan since at least the eighth century.

== Road ==
The pass on the ancient Tōsandō highway was described as early as the 8th century, in the Nihon Shoki, as Yamato Takeru went through the pass during his journey in eastern Japan. Later, the Nakasendō, one of the five routes of the Edo period maintained by the Tokugawa shogunate (and one of the two that connected Edo, modern-day Tokyo, to Kyoto) followed the route through the pass.

The modern National Route 18, which goes through the pass, serves as a major link between the popular tourist spot Karuizawa and the Kantō plain (including Tokyo). A bypass and an expressway now make the trip faster and safer. The original road still exists, but as of 2024 had been closed for several months because of a landslip between Karuizawa and Kumadaira. When open, the road is popular with cyclists because few motorcars attempt its 180 hairpin bends.

The Usui Pass is the home course of drift racer Keiichi Tsuchiya. It was also featured in the racing manga Initial D as the home course of the team Impact Blue where the protagonist Takumi Fujiwara races a SilEighty driven by Mako Sato.

== Railway ==
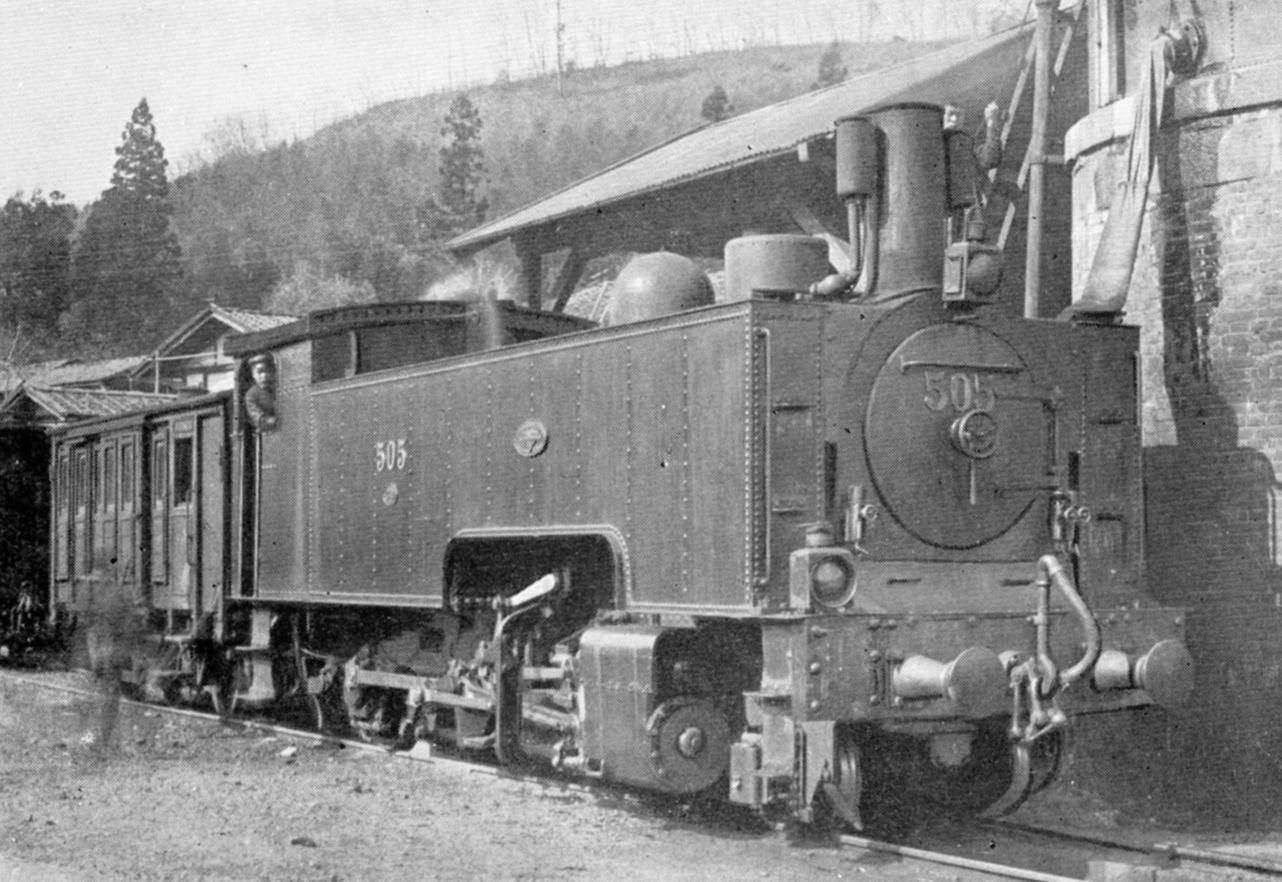
Class 3920 steam locomotive for Abt-system (rack-and-pinion railway) manufactured by Beyer, Peacock & Company in 1895

The Shin'etsu Main Line railway went through the pass between 1893 and 1997. The 11.2 km pass segment, between Yokokawa Station on the Gunma side and Karuizawa Station on the Nagano side, had been operated with the rack-and-pinion railway system until 1963 when the line was rebuilt and new locomotives for non-rack operation were introduced. The new locomotives were the JNR Class EF63 banking engines used for help in both ascending and descending the 6.7% (1 in 15) gradient line. In 1997, the segment was closed due to opening of the new Nagano Shinkansen (Hokuriku Shinkansen) line that detours the pass with a long tunnel. A museum now stands on the site of the old locomotive shed at Yokokawa. A link to archival footage of the rack railway operation is available here

The prior-1963 line was featured in the Rail Wars! episodes 8 and 9, where the characters take it with a Draisine.
