= 489 series =

Japanese train type

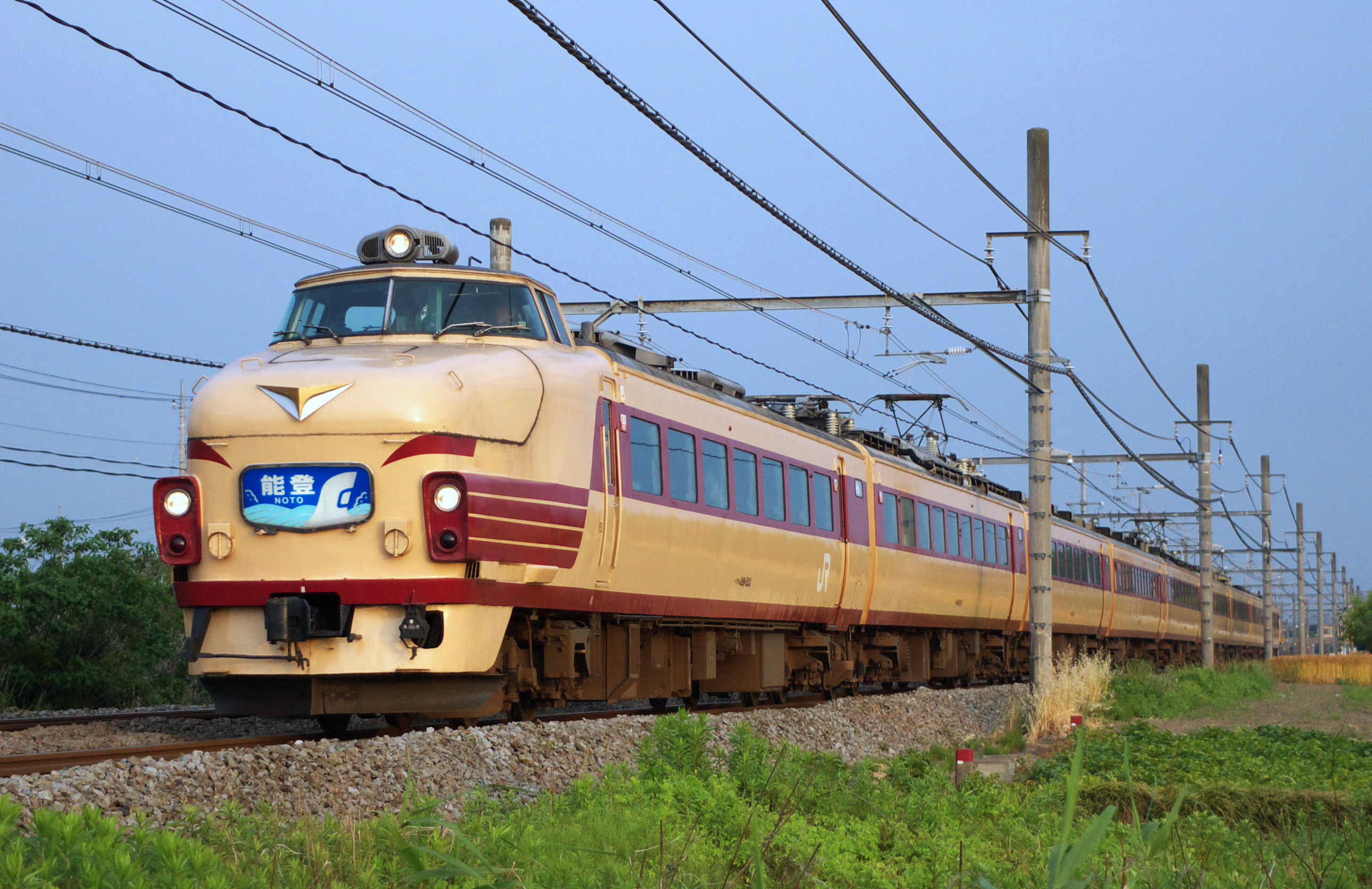
- 489 series on a Noto service in May 2007
- In service: 1972–2012
- Replaced: KiHa 80 series
- Constructed: 1971–1979
- Number in service: None
- Number preserved: 2 vehicles
- Operators: JNR (1972–1987); JR East(1987–2000); JR-West (1987–2012)
- Depot: Kanazawa

Specifications
- Maximum speed: 120 km/h (75 mph)
- Traction system: Resistor control
- Electric system: 1,500 V DC / 20 kV AC, 50/60 Hz
- Current collection: overhead catenary
- Braking systems: Dynamic brake, electro-pneumatic brake
- Safety system: ATS
- Track gauge: 1,067 mm (3 ft 6 in)

The 489 series (489系, 489-kei) was a limited express electric multiple unit (EMU) train type introduced in March 1972 by Japanese National Railways (JNR) in Japan, and later operated by East Japan Railway Company (JR East) and West Japan Railway Company (JR-West) until 2012.

== Operations ==
The 489 series trains were developed from the earlier 485 series specially for use on the Hakusan and Asama limited express services operating over the steeply graded Usui Pass (Yokokawa Station - Karuizawa Station of old JNR Shinetsu Main Line). They were designed to operate in multiple with the JNR Class EF63 electric banking locomotives.

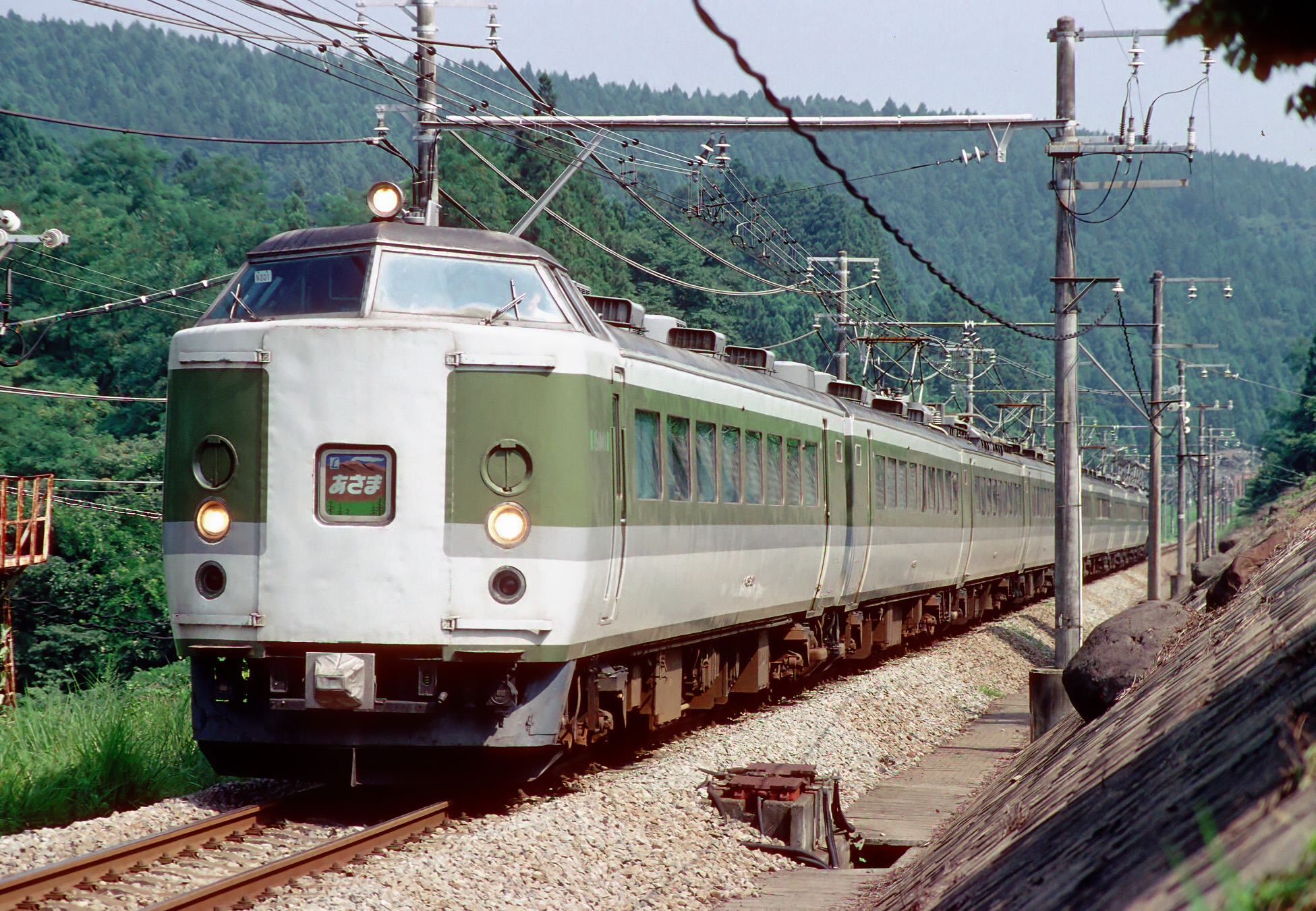
A 489 series EMU on an Asama service in August 1997

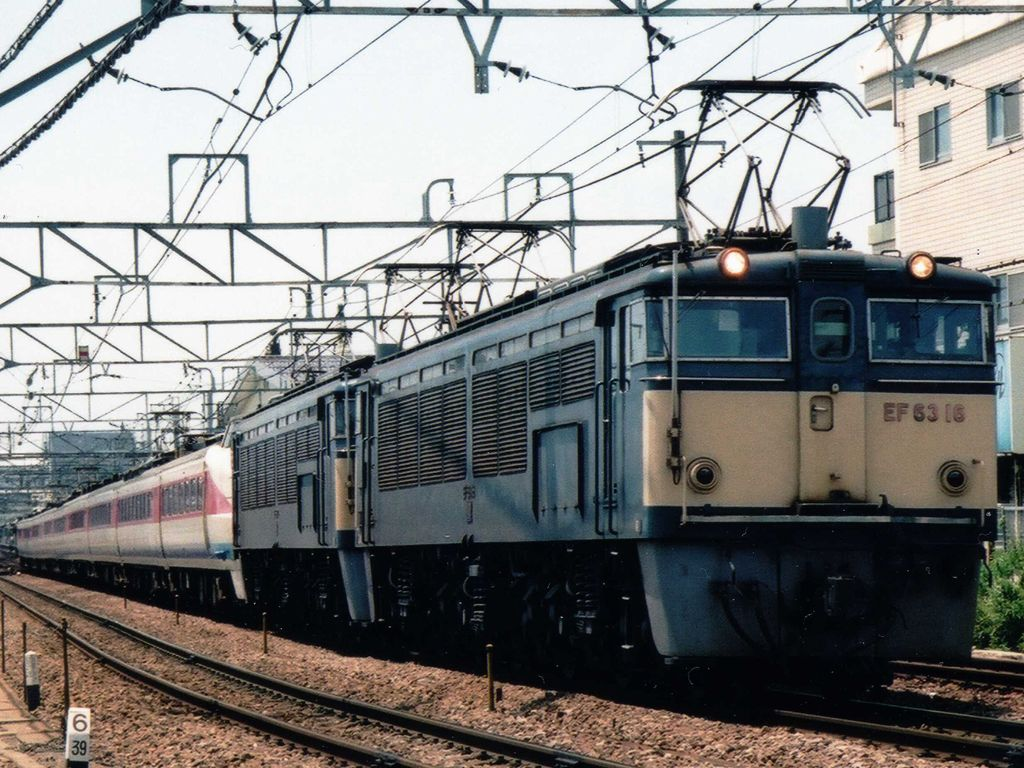
A 489 series EMU hauled by EF63 banking locomotives on an Hakusan service in June 1997

== Formations ==
The nine-car sets operated by JR-West and based at Kanazawa depot for use on Noto and Hakutaka services were formed as shown below.

Car No.	1	2	3	4	5	6	7	8	9
Numbering	KuHa 489-500	MoHa 488	MoHa 489	SaRo 489	MoHa 488-200	MoHa 489	MoHa 488	MoHa 489	KuHa 489
Facilities	Toilet			Phone / Toilet	Toilet	Lounge area	Toilet		

Cars 2, 5, and 7 were each fitted with two lozenge-type pantographs.

== History ==
Following the end of regular Noto express services in March 2010, the three remaining JR-West 489 series sets based at Kanazawa depot lost their regular duties, and two sets were withdrawn in June and August of the same year.

The remaining set, H01, was used on a special "Arigato" ("Thankyou") run between Osaka and Kanazawa on 26 and 27 March 2011, after which it was stored at Kanazawa depot.

Set H01 was officially withdrawn on 1 June 2012.

== Preserved examples ==
- KuHa 489-1: Preserved at the Kyoto Railway Museum in Kyoto since April 2016.
- KuHa 489-501: Preserved in Komatsu, Ishikawa (since March 2013)
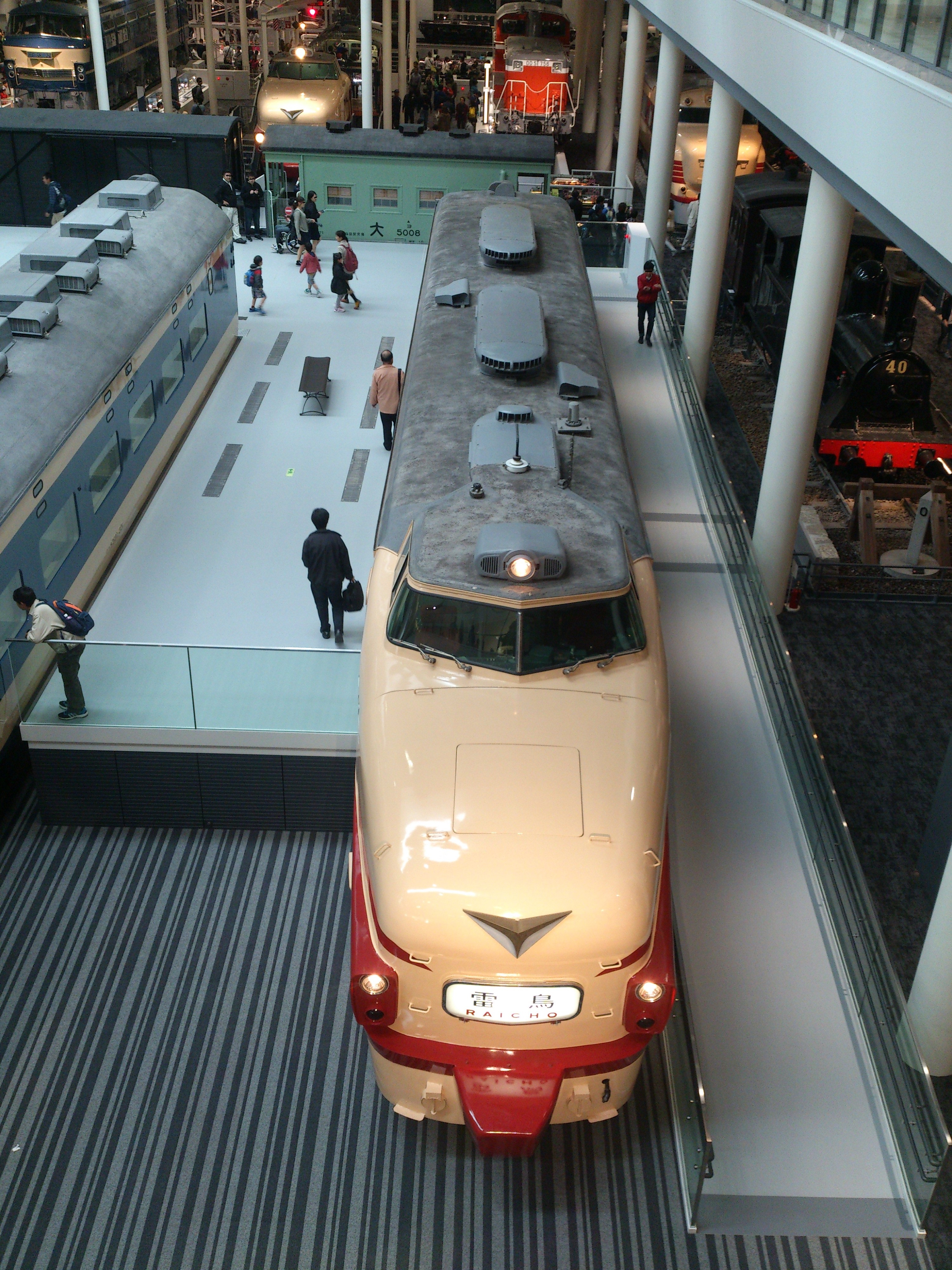
KuHa 489-1 at the Kyoto Railway Museum in April 2016

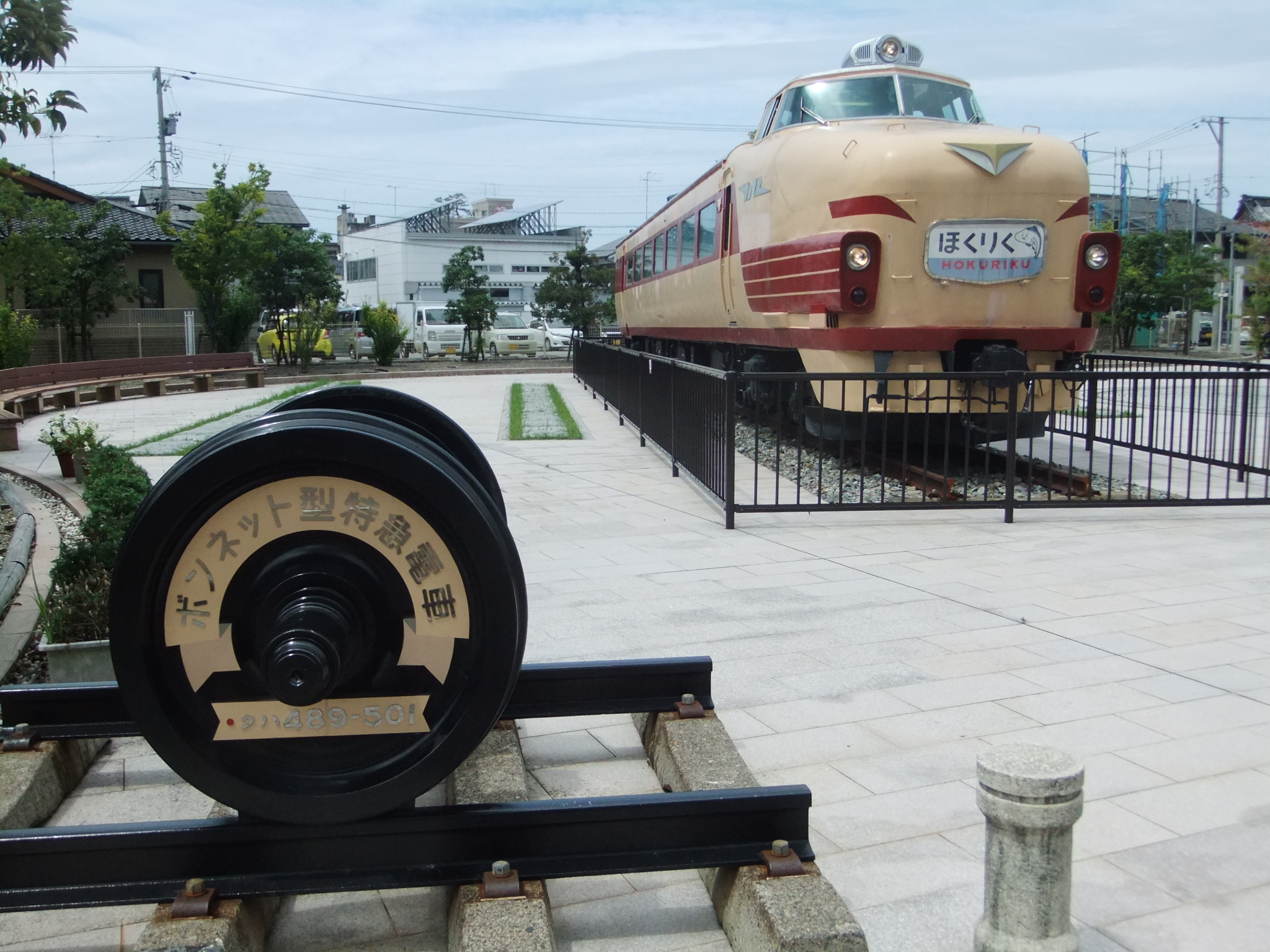
KuHa 489-501 in Komatsu in August 2014
