= JNR Class EF70 =

Class of 81 Japanese AC electric locomotives

Class EF70
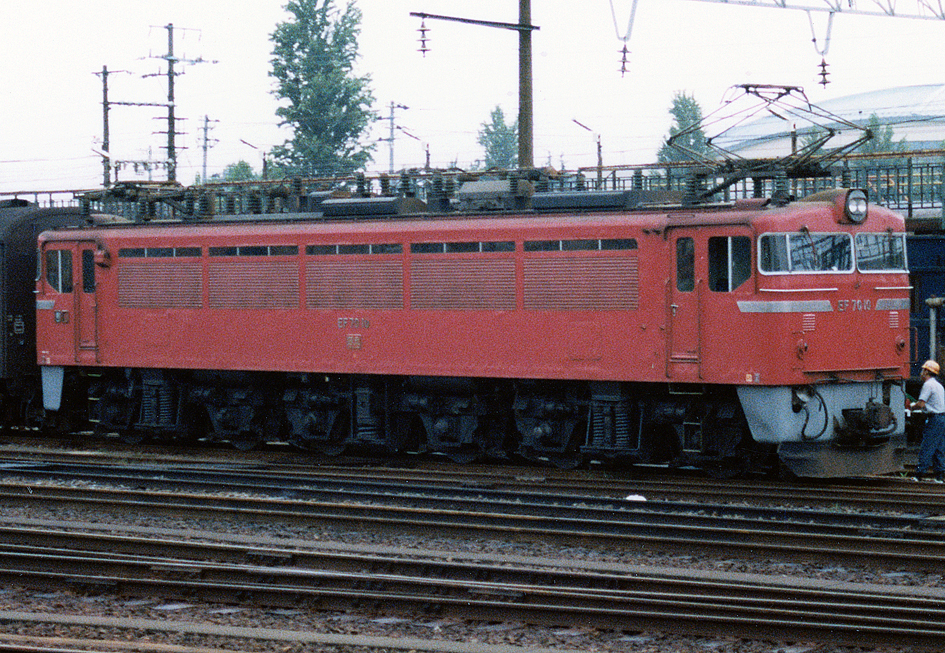
- EF70 10 in 1982
Type and origin
- Power type: Electric
- Builder: Hitachi, Mitsubishi
- Build date: 1961–1965
- Total produced: 81
Specifications
- Configuration
  - UIC: Bo-Bo-Bo
- Gauge: 1,067 mm (3 ft 6 in)
- Bogies: DT120 (outer), DT121 (centre)
- Wheel diameter: 1,120 mm (44.09 in)
- Length: 16,750 mm (54 ft 11 1/2 in)
- Width: 2,805 mm (9 ft 2 3/8 in)
- Height: 4,260 mm (13 ft 11 3/4 in)
- Loco weight: 96.0 t (94.5 long tons; 105.8 short tons)
- Electric system/s: 20 kV AC at 60 Hz overhead wire
- Current pickup: Pantograph
Performance figures
- Maximum speed: 105 km/h (65 mph)
- Power output: 2,300 kW (3,100 hp)
Career
- Operators: JNR
- Number in class: 81
- Numbers: EF70 1 – 81, EF70 1001 – 1007
- Delivered: 1961
- Withdrawn: 1986-1987
- Preserved: 2
- Disposition: All withdrawn

The Class EF70 (EF70形) is a Bo-Bo-Bo wheel arrangement AC electric locomotive type operated by Japanese National Railways (JNR) in Japan from 1961 until the 1980s. 81 locomotives were built by Hitachi and Mitsubishi between 1961 and 1965.

== Variants ==
- EF70-0: Numbers EF70 1 – 81
- EF70-1000: Numbers EF70 1001 – 1007 renumbered from EF70 22 to 28 in 1968
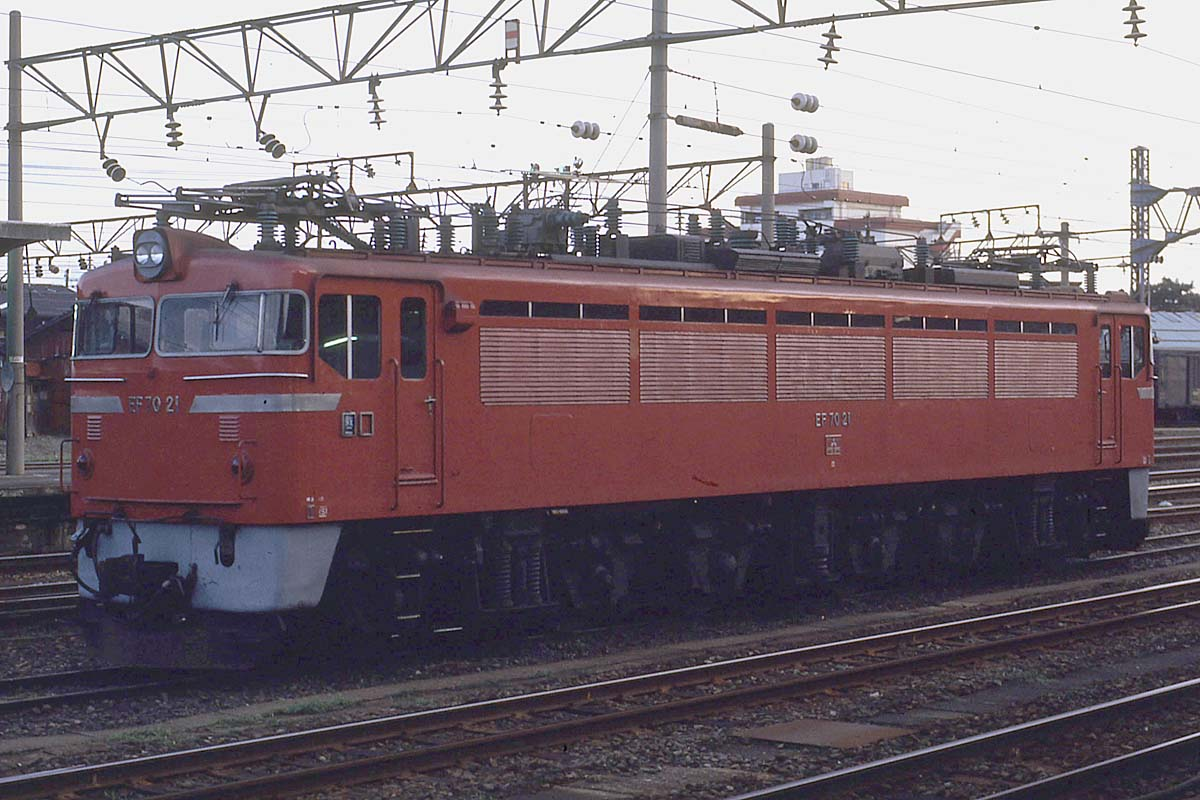
First-batch type EF70 21 in 1983

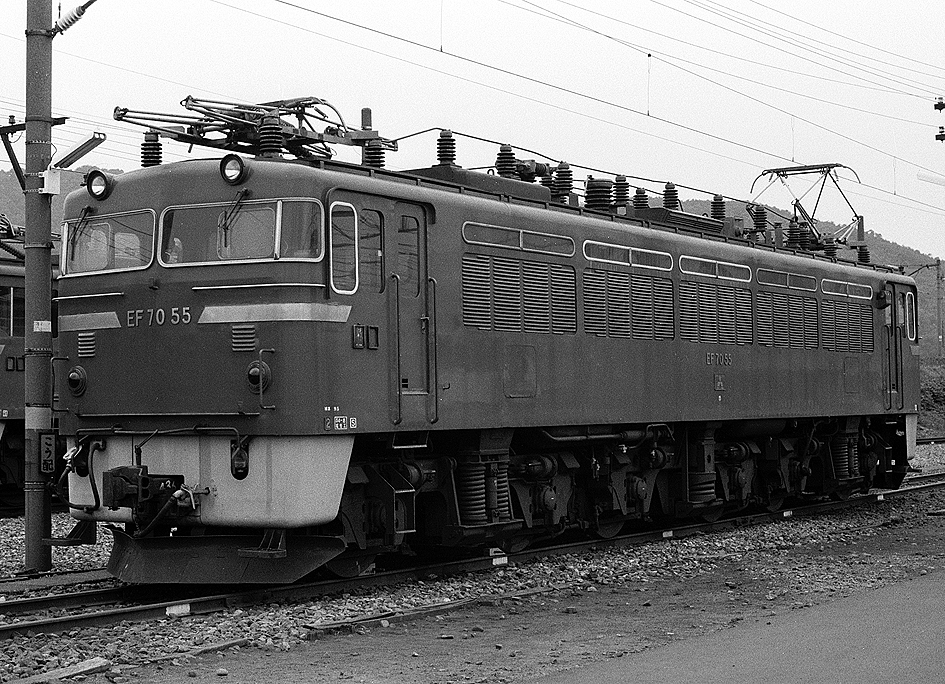
Second-batch type EF70 55 in 1984

== Design ==
The Class EF70 was developed for use through the steeply graded Hokuriku Tunnel on the Hokuriku Main Line, and was designed to be capable of hauling 1,300 tonne freight trains on a 10‰ gradient and passenger trains at up to 100 km/h (62 mph). The locomotives had two PS100A pantographs, but normally operated with only the rear pantograph raised.

Locomotive numbers EF70 22 onward (built from 1964) incorporated minor design changes, including two roof-mounted headlights replacing the original centrally mounted single headlight, and changes to the cabside window design.

== History ==
In 1968, seven locomotives, EF70 22 to 28, were modified for use on sleeping car services, and were renumbered EF70 1001 to 1007.

With the introduction of Class EF81 multi-voltage AC/DC electric locomotives, many of the Class EF70 locomotives became surplus, and numbers 61 to 81 were transferred to Kyushu in 1980 to replace Class ED72 and Class ED73 AC locomotives, but they themselves were soon replaced.

By 1984, only a small number of the class remained in service on the Hokuriku Main Line, with most of the class removed from service coinciding with the March 1985 timetable revision. All of the class except EF70 1 were officially withdrawn in March 1986, and EF70 1 was finally withdrawn in March 1987.

== Preserved examples ==
As of 1 April 2014, two members of the class are preserved: EF70 57, together with camping carriages at a youth facility in Hakusan, Ishikawa, and EF70 1001 at the Usui Pass Railway Heritage Park in Gunma Prefecture.

The camping facility where EF70 57 is preserved closed in March 2013, and cutting up of the camping coaches commenced in February 2016.

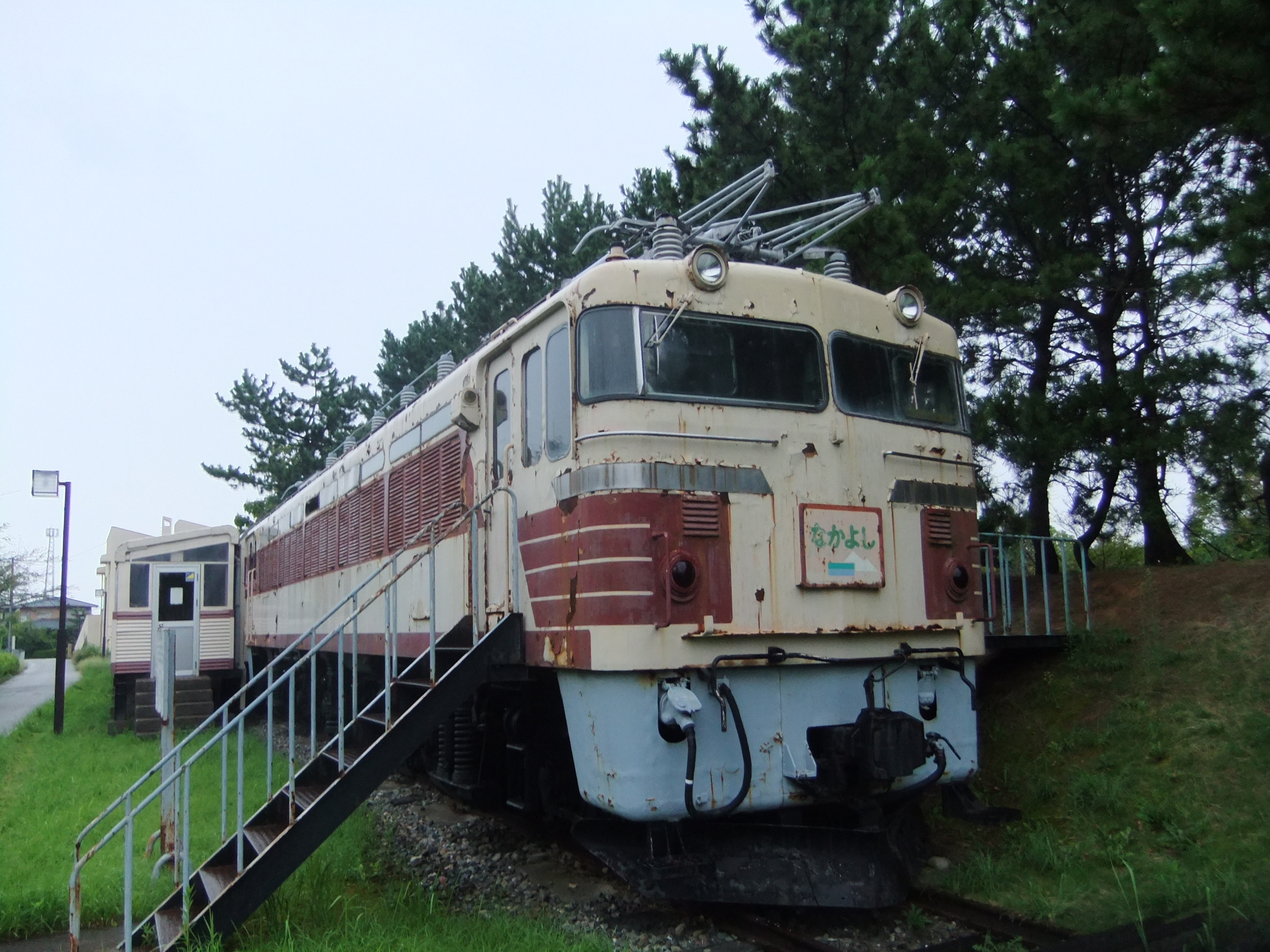
Preserved EF70 57 in August 2014

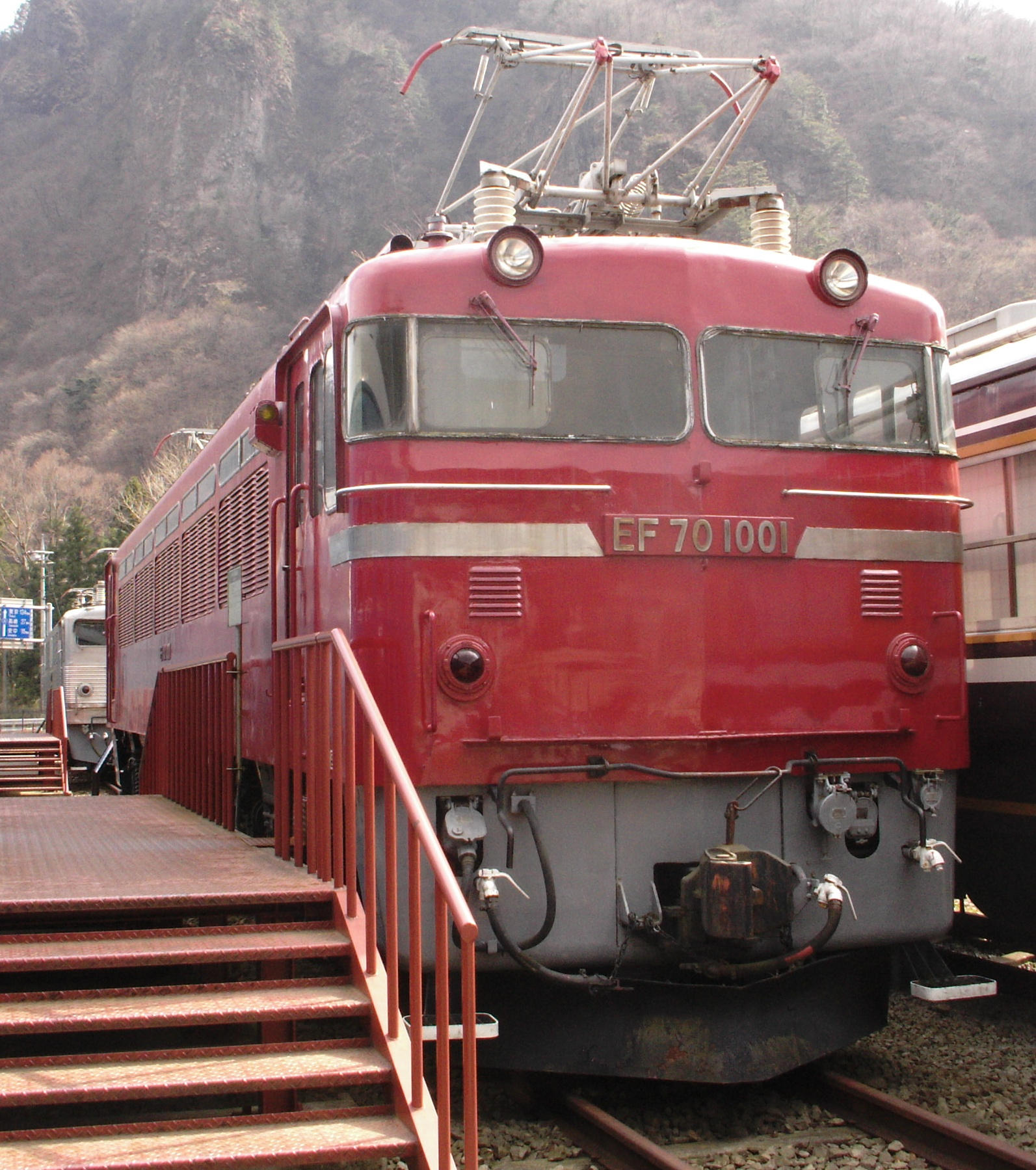
Preserved EF70 1001 in April 2007

== Classification ==
The EF70 classification for this locomotive type is explained below.

- E: Electric locomotive
- F: Six driving axles
- 7x: AC locomotive with maximum speed exceeding 85 km/h (55 mph)
