= Hokuriku (train) =

Japanese sleeper train service

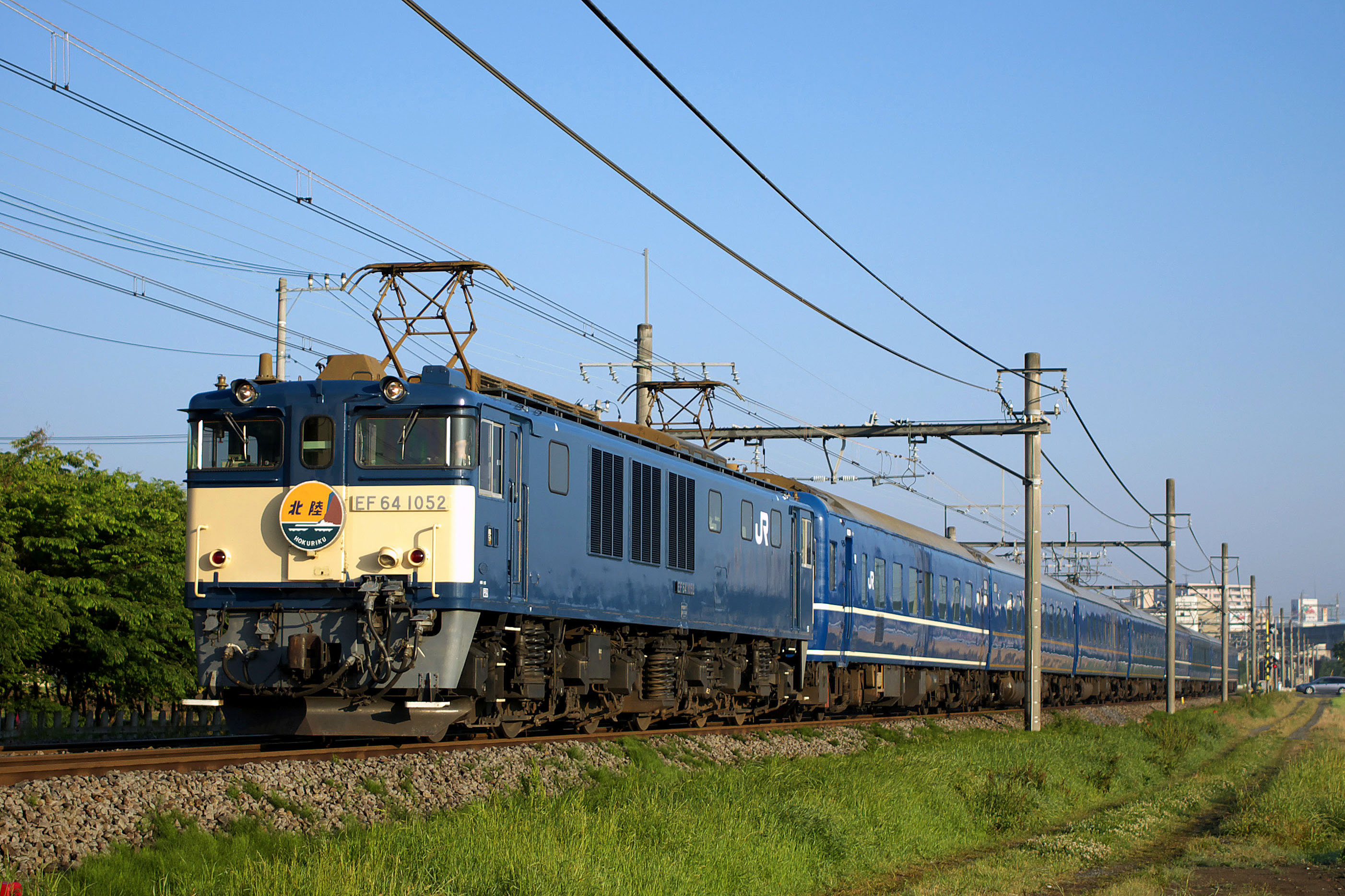
- Hokuriku service hauled by an EF64-1000 locomotive, May 2007

Overview
- Service type: Limited express
- Status: Discontinued
- Locale: Honshu, Japan
- First service: 2 November 1950 (Express); 10 March 1975 (Limited express)
- Last service: March 2010
- Former operator(s): JNR, JR East

Route
- Termini: Ueno; Kanazawa
- Line(s) used: Tōhoku Main Line, Jōetsu Line, Shinetsu Main Line, Hokuriku Main Line

On-board services
- Seating arrangements: None
- Sleeping arrangements: 4-berth couchettes

Technical
- Rolling stock: 14 series sleeper coaches
- Operating speed: 110 km/h (70 mph)

The Hokuriku (北陸) was a "Blue Train" limited express sleeper train service formerly operated by Japanese National Railways (JNR) and later by East Japan Railway Company (JR East), which ran between Ueno Station in Tokyo and Kanazawa via the Shinetsu Main Line and Hokuriku Main Line. The journey took more than seven hours. The service was discontinued on 13 March 2010.

== Rolling stock ==
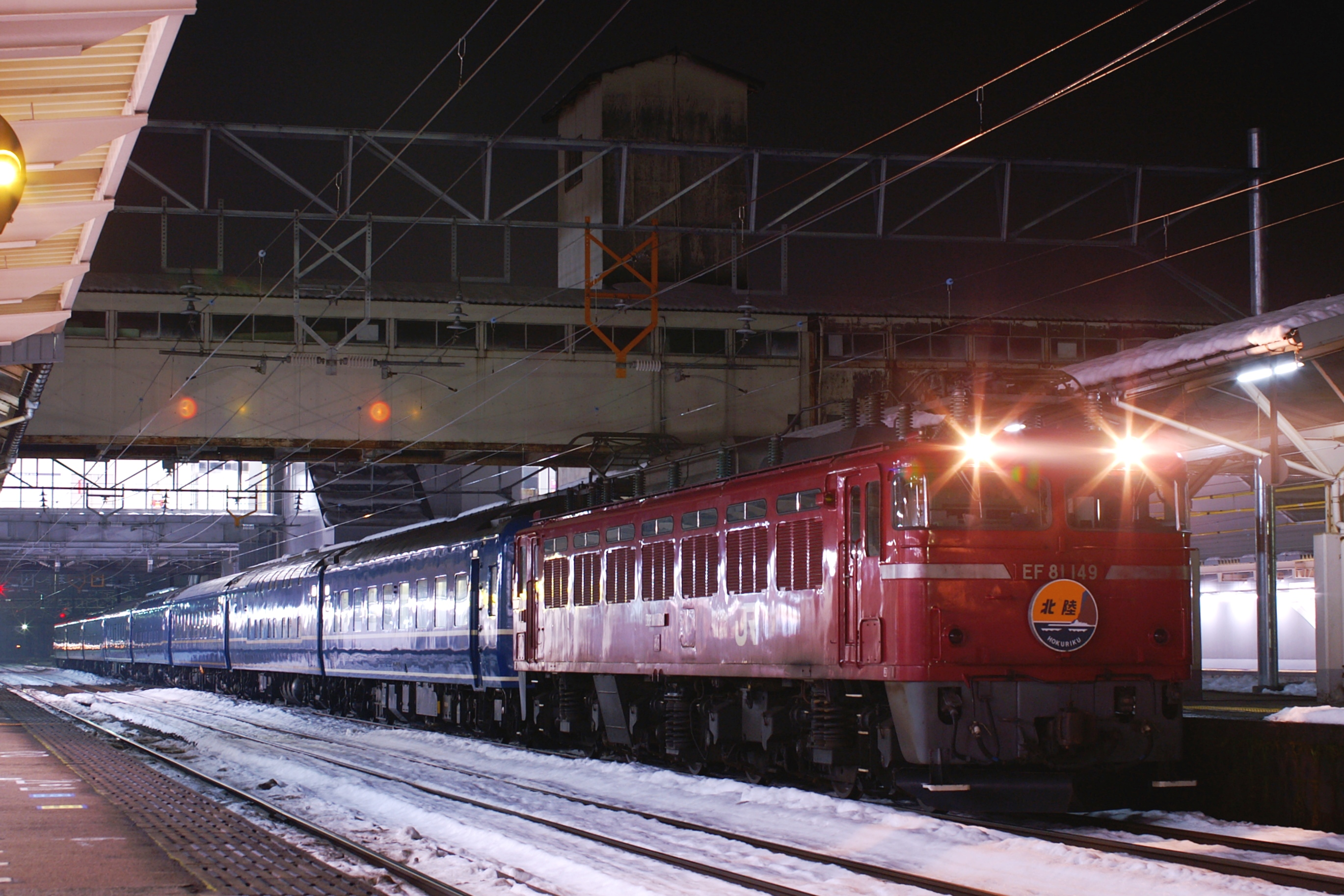
A down Hokuriku service at Takaoka Station, hauled by an EF81 locomotive, January 2010

The train was formed of 14 series sleeping cars based at JR East's Oku Depot in Tokyo, typically consisting of 8 cars. The train was hauled by a JR East Nagaoka-based EF64-1000 DC electric locomotive between Ueno and Nagaoka, where the train reversed, and by a JR East Nagaoka-based EF81 dual-voltage locomotive between Nagaoka and Kanazawa.

After the discontinuation, a number of sleeping cars was sold to the Philippine National Railways.

== History ==
=== 1950: Ueno - Osaka ===
The Hokuriku name was first used from 2 November 1950 for an overnight express service operating between Ueno and Osaka via Kanazawa. The journey from Ueno to Osaka took 18 hours 45 minutes.

=== 1956: Ueno – Fukui ===
From the 19 November 1956 timetable revision following the electrification of the Tokaido Main Line, the Hokuriku became an overnight train operating between Ueno and Fukui, taking 12 hours 45 minutes.

=== 1959: Ueno – Kanazawa ===
From the 22 November 1959 timetable revision, the train was operated between Ueno and Kanazawa, due to declining passenger numbers between Kanazawa and Fukui. The journey took exactly 11 hours.

=== 1968: Ueno – Fukui ===
From the 1 October 1968 timetable revision, the previous Echizen overnight train operating between Ueno and Kanazawa became a seasonal service extended to operate between Ueno and Fukui and renamed Hokuriku 1. This train consisted mostly of seating accommodation using SuHa43 coaches. The existing Hokuriku service between Ueno and Kanazawa became the Hokuriku 2 service.

=== 1975: Limited Express Hokuriku ===
From the 10 March 1975 timetable revision, the Hokuriku 1 service was upgraded to become the limited express Hokuriku, operating between Ueno and Kanazawa, with a journey time of 8 hours 47 minutes, and using new 20 series sleeping cars. The Hokuriku 2 service was renamed Noto. The train was upgraded to 14 series stock from 2 October 1978.

=== 2010: Withdrawal ===
The service was discontinued on 13 March 2010, with the last runs from Kanazawa and Ueno on 12 March 2010.

== Preservation ==
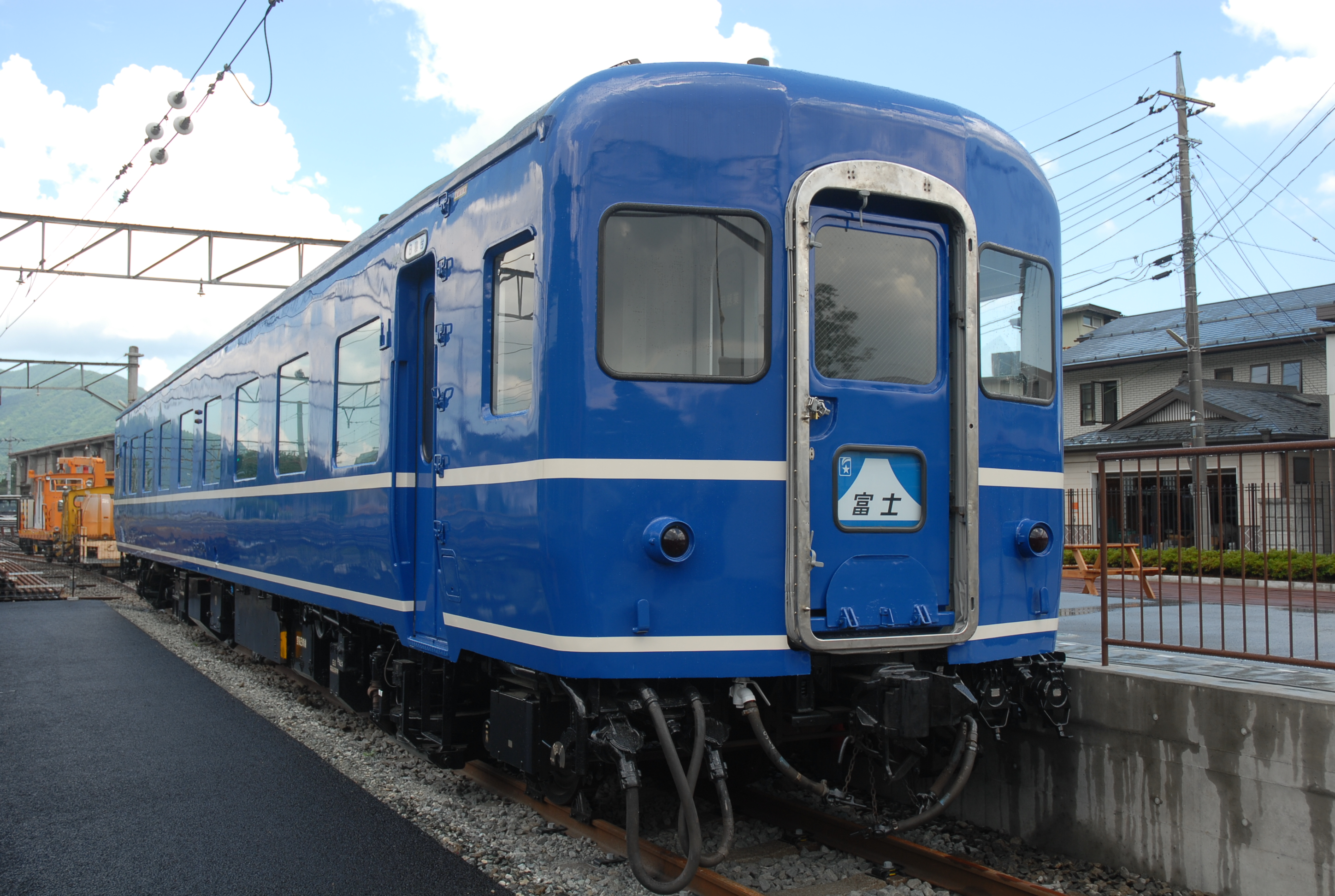
SuHaNeFu 14-20 preserved next to Shimoyoshida Station, July 2011

One car from the formation used on the final run of the Hokuriku from Ueno in March 2010, SuHaNeFu 14-20, is preserved on display next to Shimoyoshida Station on the Fujikyuko Line. It displays a Fuji headboard.

== See also ==
- List of named passenger trains of Japan
