= Usui Pass Railway Heritage Park =

- 碓氷峠鉄道文化むら
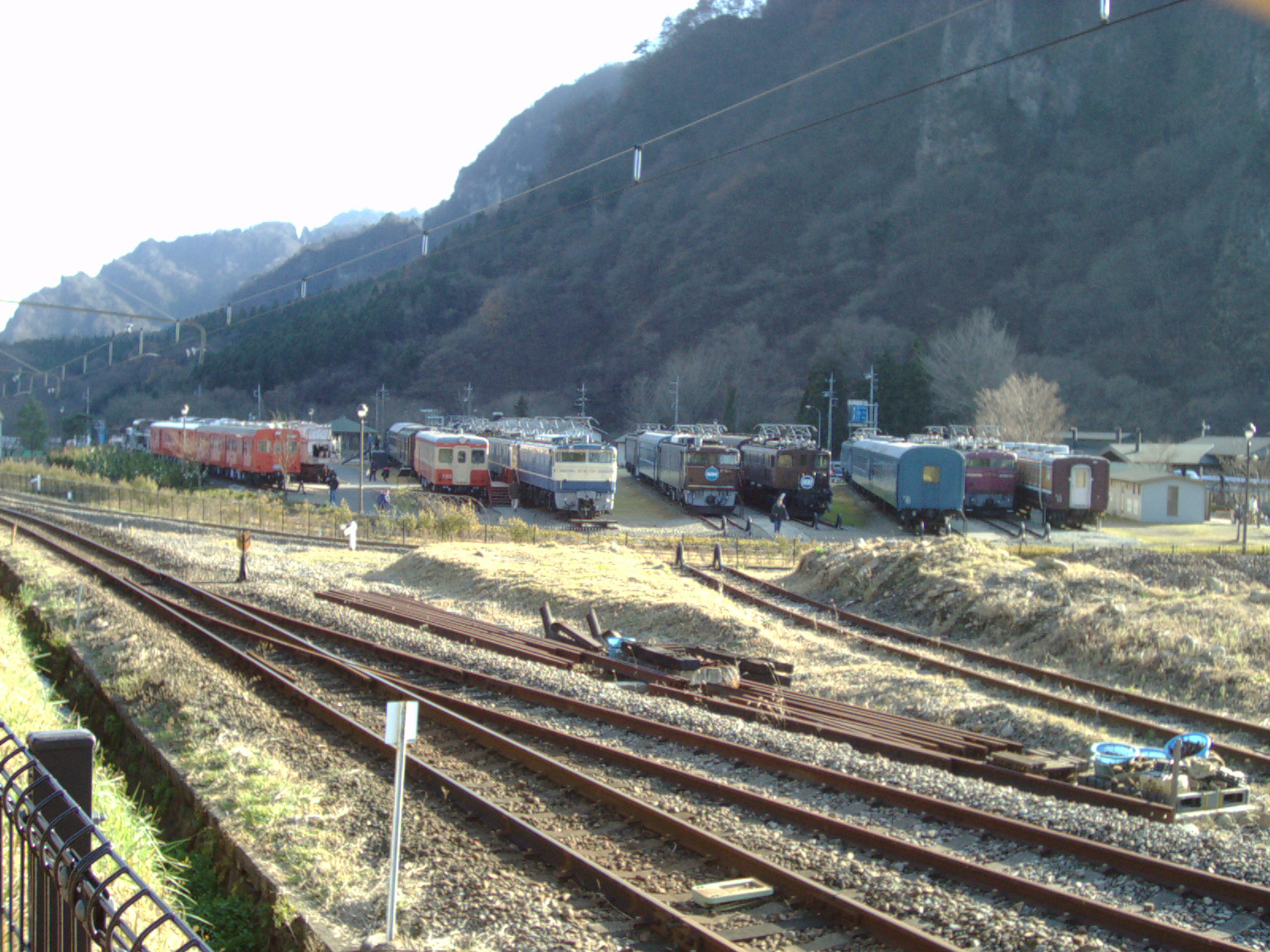
- General view, December 2004

- Location within Japan
- Established: 18 April 1998
- Location: Annaka, Gunma, Japan
- Coordinates: 36°20′11″N 138°44′02″E
- Type: Railway museum
- Public transit access: Yokokawa Station
- Website: Official website

The Usui Pass Railway Heritage Park (碓氷峠鉄道文化むら, Usui-tōge Tetsudō Bunkamura) is an open-air railway museum located in Annaka, Gunma, Japan. It is operated by Usui Pass Exchange Memorial Foundation, and was opened on 18 April 1998 on the site of the former Yokokawa motive power depot alongside the Shin'etsu Main Line, of which the section between Yokokawa station and Karuizawa station (also known as the Usui Line) was discontinued on 1 October 1997.

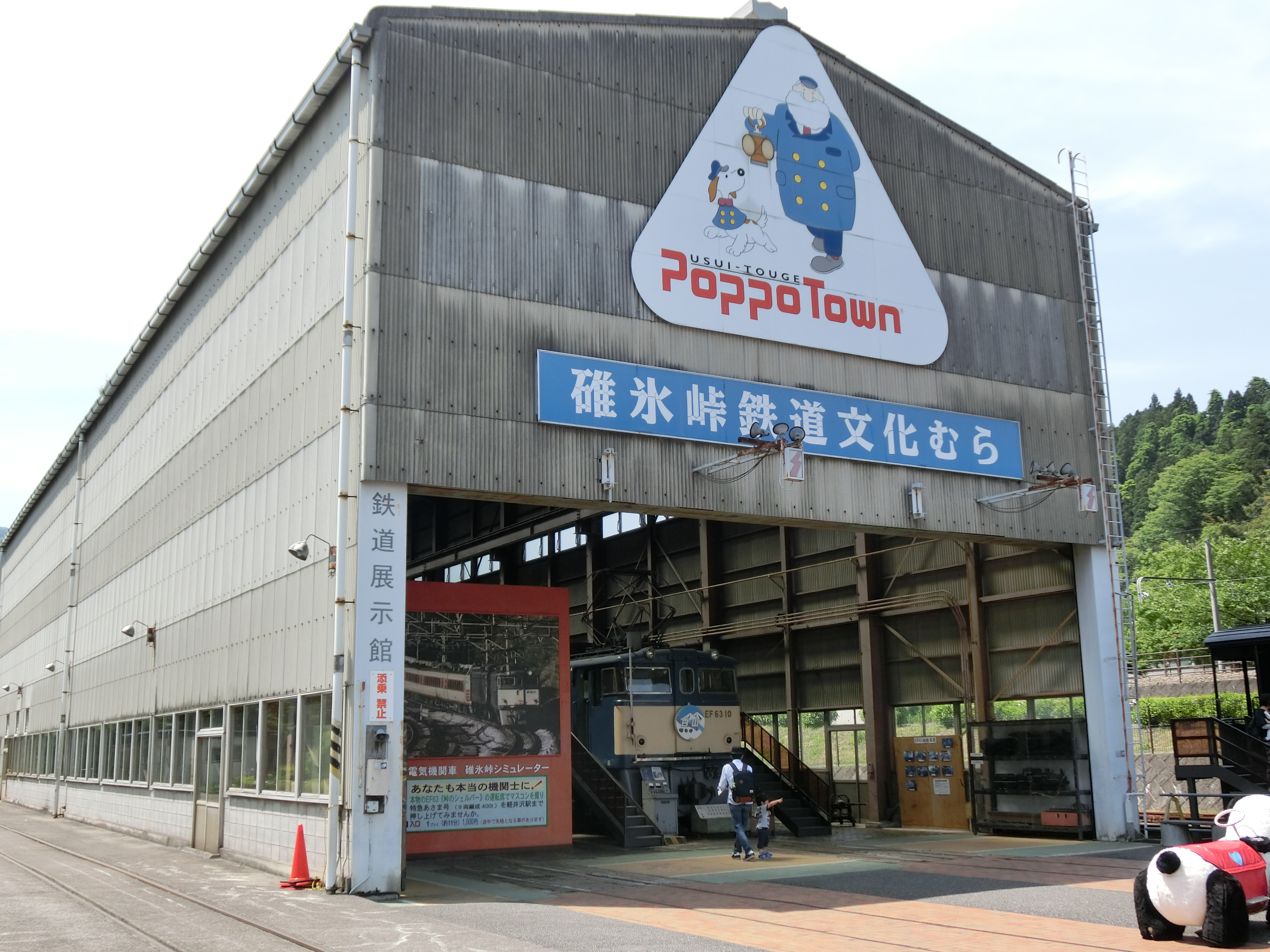
Exhibition Pavilion

The Usui Pass Railway Heritage Park preserves railway vehicles that have run in Japan in the past but have since been unused, including ED42, (Note: An Abt type electric locomotive vehicle that was used only on the Usui Line. See also: ja:国鉄ED42形電気機関車.) and also preserves EF63 type vehicles in working order.
