= JNR Class ED73 =

Japanese electric locomotive type

Class ED73
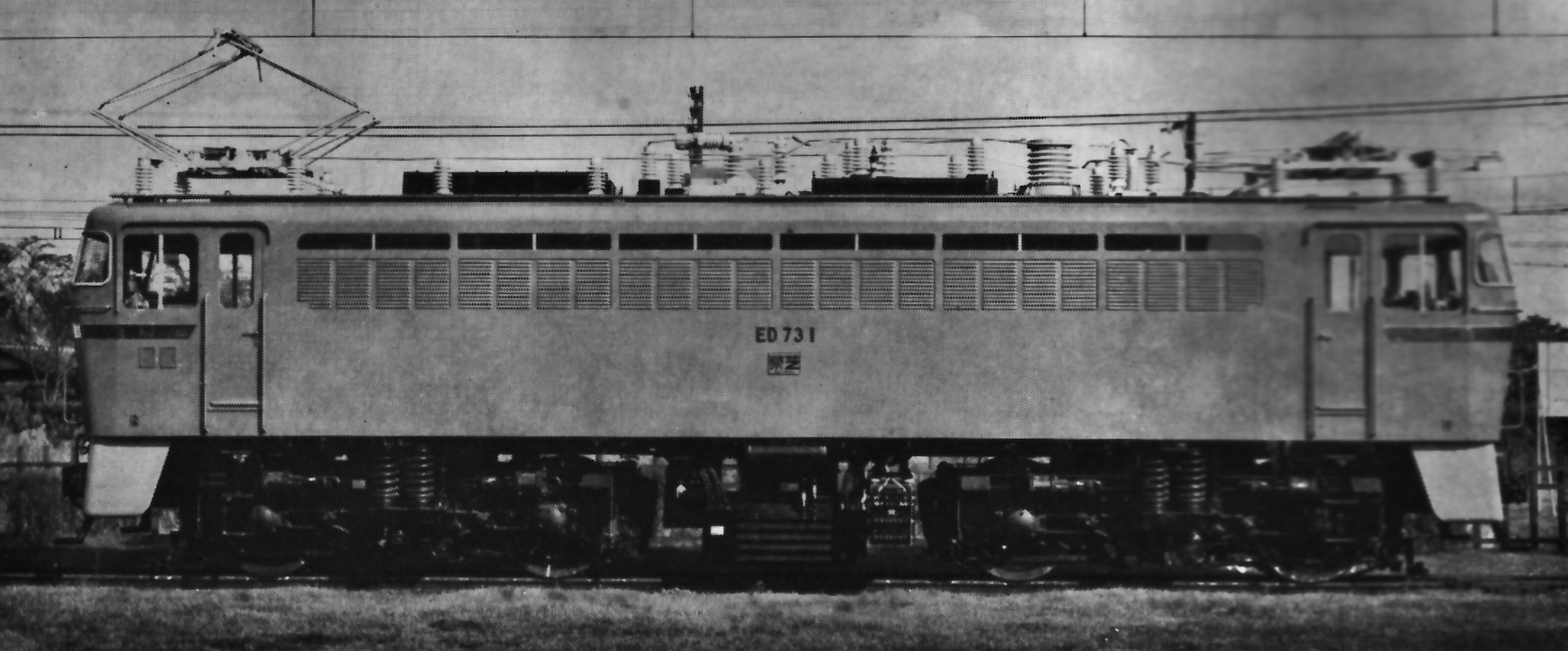
- The first locomotive delivered, ED73 1, in 1962
Type and origin
- Power type: Electric
- Builder: Toshiba
- Build date: 1962 - 1963
- Total produced: 22
Specifications
- Configuration
  - UIC: Bo-Bo
- Gauge: 1,067 mm (3 ft 6 in)
- Bogies: DT119B
- Wheel diameter: 1,120 mm (44.09 in)
- Length: 14,400 mm (47 ft 2 7/8 in)
- Width: 2,805 mm (9 ft 2 3/8 in)
- Height: 4,260 mm (13 ft 11 3/4 in)
- Loco weight: 67.2 t (66.1 long tons; 74.1 short tons)
- Electric system/s: 20 kV AC at 50/60 Hz overhead wire
- Current pickup(s): Pantograph
- Traction motors: MT52
Performance figures
- Power output: 1,900 kW (2,500 hp)
Career
- Operators: JNR
- Numbers: ED73 1–22, ED73 1001–1022
- Locale: Kyushu
- Delivered: 1962
- First run: 1962
- Retired: 1980-1983
- Preserved: 0
- Scrapped: 1980-1983
- Disposition: All Scrapped

The Class ED73 (ED73形) was a Bo-Bo wheel arrangement AC electric locomotive type operated by Japanese National Railways (JNR) in Kyushu, Japan, between 1962 and the 1980s.

== Design ==
The Class ED73 design was broadly derived from the Class ED72 locomotives introduced a year earlier, but as the Class ED73 was primarily intended for use on freight services, it did not include a steam generator for train heating, and was therefore 3 m (9 ft 10 in) shorter than the Bo-2-Bo wheel arrangement Class ED72. The DT119B bogies were also almost identical to those used on the full-production Class ED72 locomotives.

== History ==
A total of 22 locomotives were built by Toshiba between 1962 and 1963. The first locomotives were delivered to Moji Depot in northern Kyushu.

In the late 1960s, the entire class was modified with improved braking performance for use on express freight services, and the locomotives were renumbered in the ED73 10xx series. The locomotive numbers were painted yellow at this time. In later years, the class was also used on overnight sleeping car services, as these trains did not require steam heating.

The class was withdrawn by the early 1980s. No examples of the class have been preserved.

== Classification ==
The ED73 classification for this locomotive type is explained below.

- E: Electric locomotive
- D: Four driving axles
- 7x: AC locomotive with maximum speed exceeding 85 km/h (55 mph)
