= Usui (disambiguation) =

Usui is a Japanese term for yushui, one of 24 solar terms.

Usui may also refer to:

- Usui (surname), Japanese surname
- Usui Bridge, brick masonry bridge in Gunma prefecture, Japan
- Usui Pass, mountain pass between Gunma and Nagano prefectures, Japan
- Usui District, Gunma, former district in Gunma prefecture, Japan
- Usui, Fukuoka, former town in Fukuoka prefecture, Japan (now merged into the city of Kama)
- Usui Kojima (1873–1948), Japanese author
