= High-speed freight trains (Japan) =

Fast freight trains in Japan

High-speed Freight Trains (高速貨物列車) are freight trains operated by Japan Freight Railway Company (JR Freight) that run at, or exceeds 85 km/h during regular operations.

== Overview ==
High-speed freight trains are separated into three categories (A, B, C) based on their maximum operational speed. Details of each category are as follows.

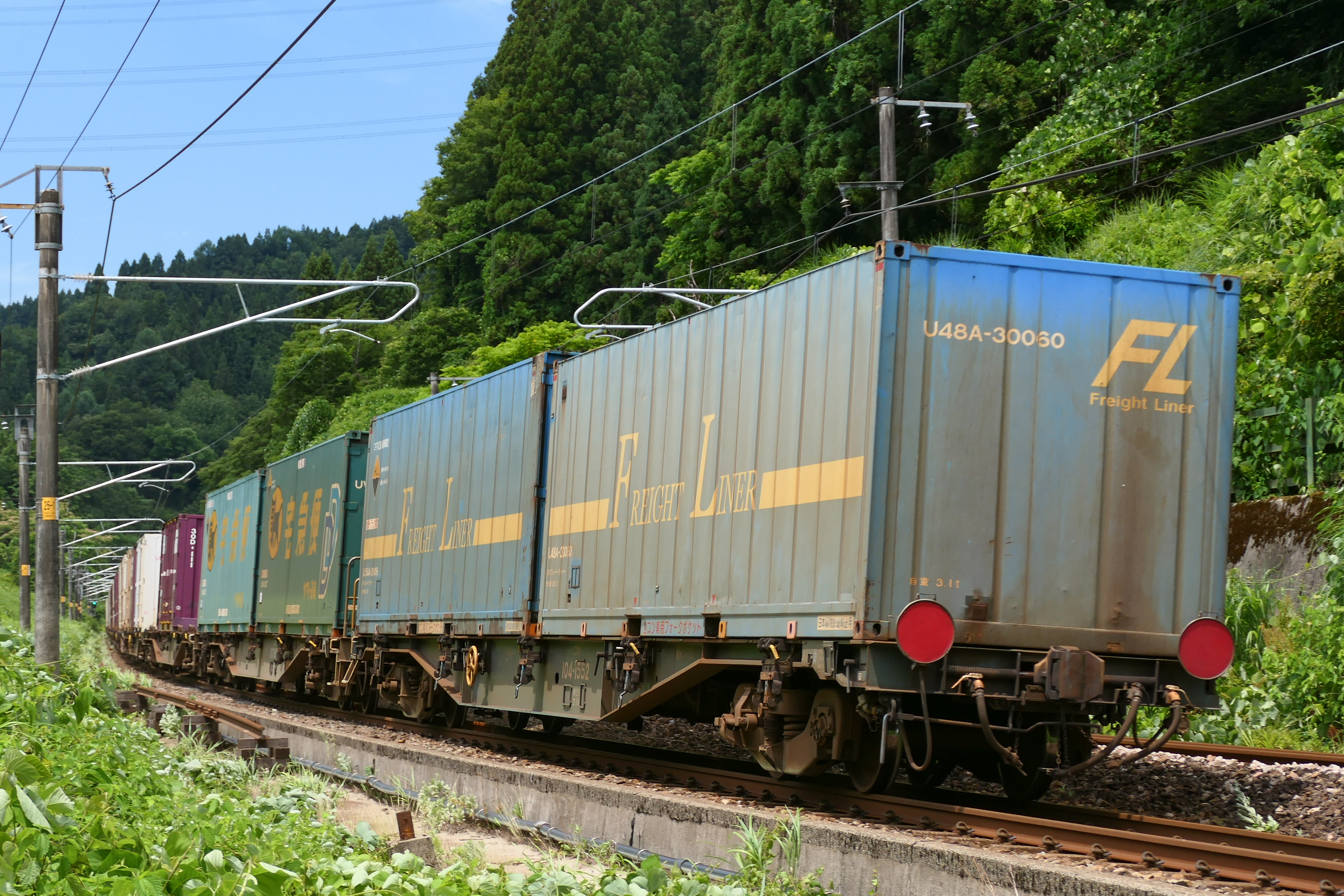
A high-speed freight train category A (July 2022)

High-speed freight train category A
Freight trains with freight cars attached operating at 100km/h to 110km/h are categorized as "A". More commonly known as "Super Liner". Operates solely with Koki 100, Koki 200, Koki 50000 high-speed flatcars.
Priority-wise, these freight trains are treated on a similar level to passenger Limited Express services according to the Freight Timetable.
The trains operated using the M250 series "Super Rail Cargo" were not specifically listed in the March 2005 Freight Timetable change. In the March 2006 Freight Timetable change, they were listed as "Special Freight". As of 2016, it is categorized as a High-speed train.

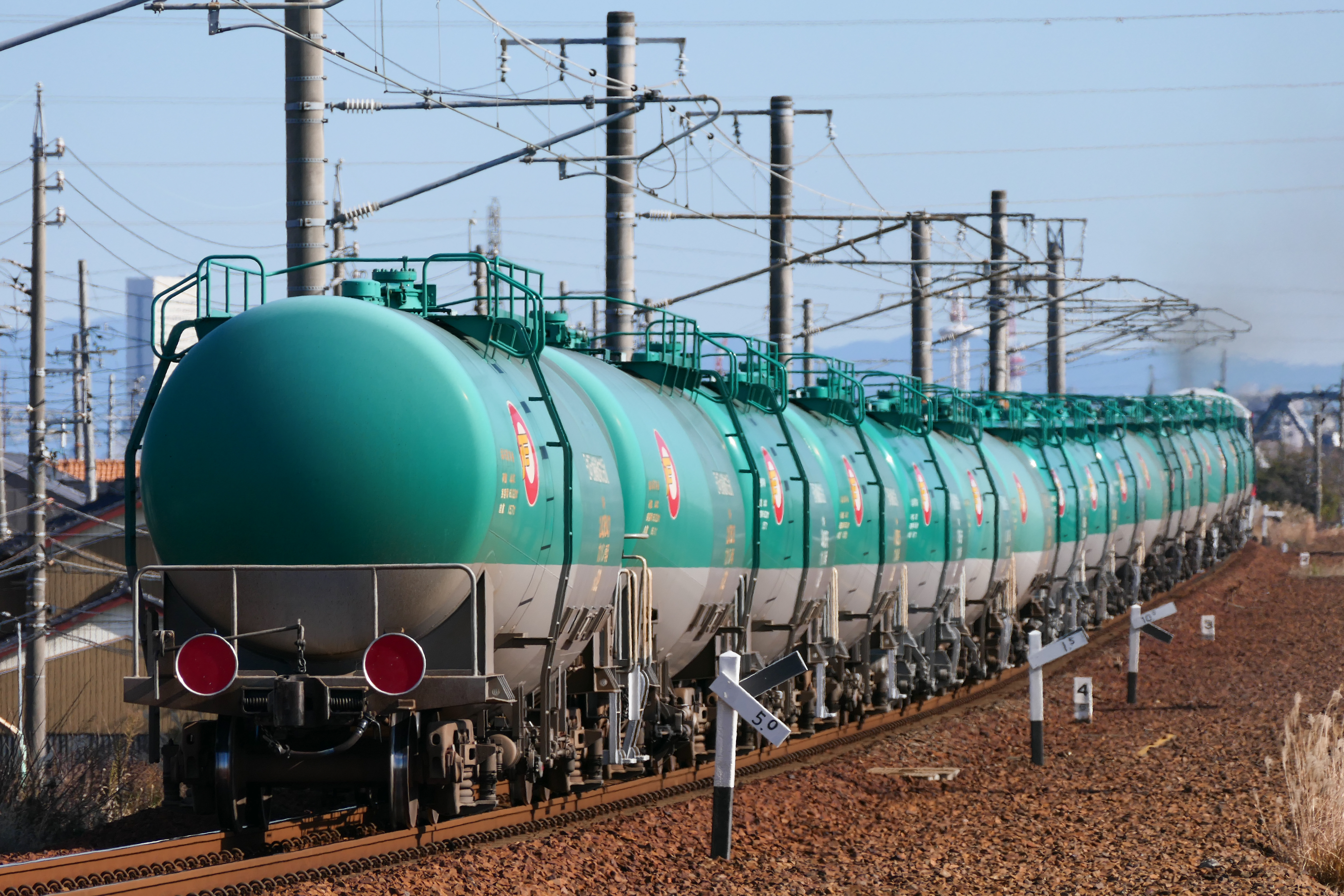
A high-speed freight train category B (December 2019)

High-speed freight train category B
Freight trains with freight cars attached operating at 95km/h are categorized as "B". These trains operate mainly using Koki 50000 and Koki 5500 flatcars, as well as those from category "A". Other freight cars used are the Taki 1000 used for transporting oil, rail transport trains consisting only of Chiki 5500, Chiki 5450 and Chiki 5400, and ore trains consisting of privately owned freight cars Toki 25000 and Taki 1200 owned by Toho Zinc are also classified in this category.

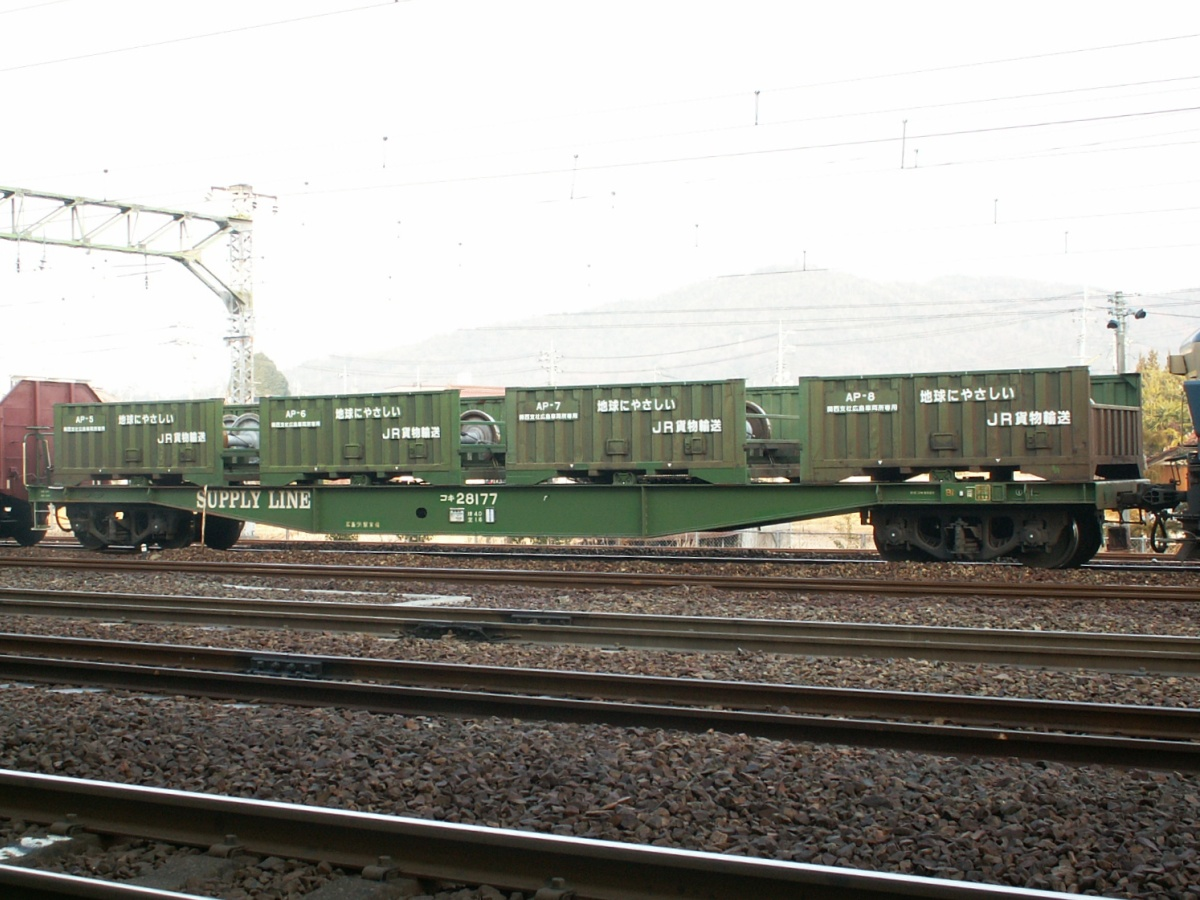
A high-speed freight train category C (January 2008)

High-speed freight train category C
Freight trains with freight cars attached operating at 85km/h are categorized as "C". These trains operate mostly with Koki 5500 freight cars, but due to the aging of the Koki 5500 over half of the freight trains using it has been abolished. As such, category "C" freight trains use a combination of high-speed freight cars from category "B" and "A".
