= Annaka, Gunma =

Annaka 安中市
- City
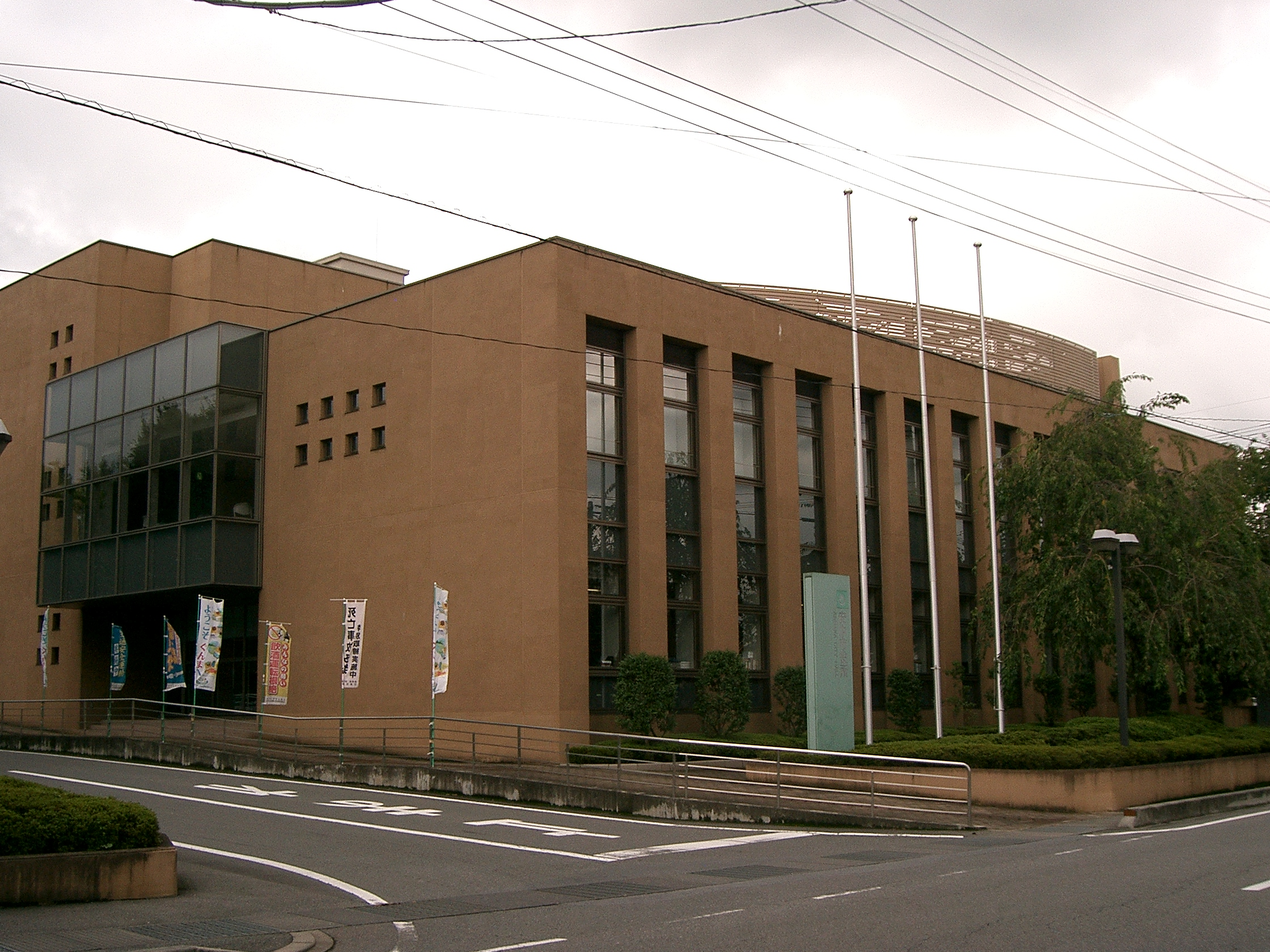
- Annaka city hall

- Flag Seal

- Location of Annaka in Gunma Prefecture

- Coordinates: 36°19′34.5″N 138°53′13.7″E
- Country: Japan
- Region: Kantō
- Prefecture: Gunma

Area
  - Total: 276.31 km^{2} (106.68 sq mi)

Population (July 2020)
  - Total: 57,013
  - Density: 206.34/km^{2} (534.41/sq mi)
- Time zone: UTC+9 (Japan Standard Time)
- Tree: Pinus, Cryptomeria japonica
- Flower: Prunus mume
- Bird: Aix galericulata
- Phone number: 027-382-1111
- Address: Annaka 1-23-13, Annaka-shi, Gunma-ken 379-0192
- Website: Official website

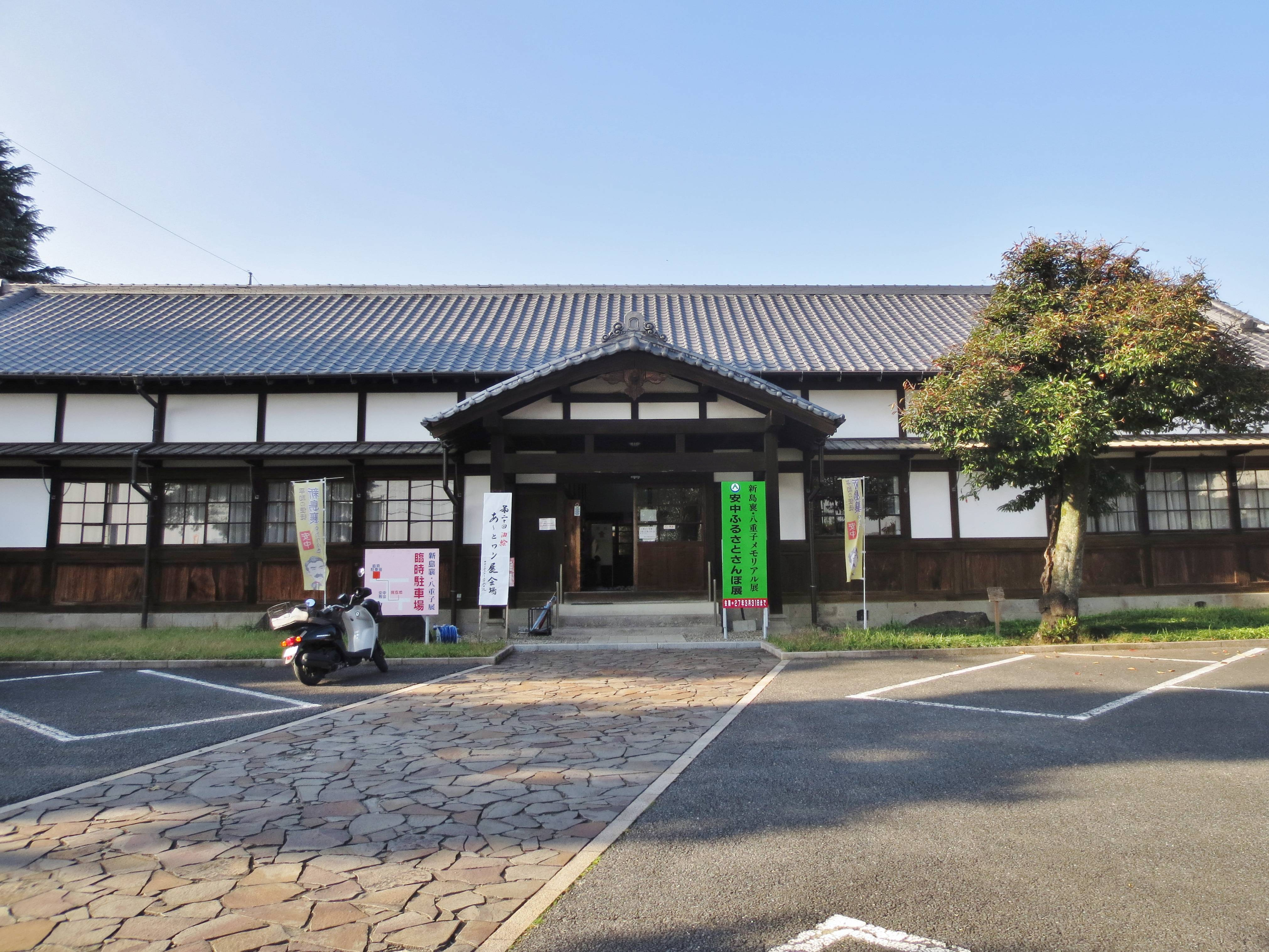
Edo-period Usui Magistrate's office in Annaka

Annaka (安中市, Annaka-shi; Japanese pronunciation: [ä̀ń.nä́.kä́(.ɕì), ä́ń-]) is a city located in Gunma Prefecture, Japan. As of 31 July 2020, the city had an estimated population of 47,911 in 24,749 households, and a population density of 210 persons per square kilometre. The total area of the city is 276.31 km^{2} (106.68 sq mi).

== Geography ==
Annaka is located in the southwestern portion of Gunma Prefecture at the very northernmost point of the Kantō Plain, bordered by Nagano Prefecture to the west. The Usui Pass connects Annaka with neighboring Karuizawa, Nagano.

- Mountains: Chausuyama (596 m), Mount Myōgi (1,103 m)
- Rivers: Usigawa, Tsukumogawa
- Lakes: Sakamoto Dam, Nakagi Dam

=== Surrounding municipalities ===
Gunma Prefecture

- Shimonita
- Takasaki
- Tomioka

Nagano Prefecture

- Karuizawa

=== Climate ===
Annaka has a humid subtropical climate (Köppen Cfa) characterized by warm summers and cold winters with heavy snowfall. The average annual temperature in Annaka is 13.9 °C. The average annual rainfall is 1,227 mm with September as the wettest month. The temperatures are highest on average in August, at around 26.3 °C, and lowest in January, at around 2.5 °C.

== Demographics ==
Per Japanese census data, the population of Annaka has recently declined after decades of relative stability.

Historical population
Year	Pop.	±%
1920	51,015	—
1930	53,052	+4.0%
1940	52,898	−0.3%
1950	68,710	+29.9%
1960	61,870	−10.0%
1970	59,970	−3.1%
1980	62,274	+3.8%
1990	64,326	+3.3%
2000	64,893	+0.9%
2010	61,053	−5.9%
2020	54,907	−10.1%

== History ==
Annaka is located within traditional Kōzuke Province. During the Edo period, central Annaka was the jōkamachi of Annaka Domain, a feudal domain held by the Itakura clan under the Tokugawa shogunate. The area also prospered from its location on the Nakasendō highway connecting Edo with Kyoto. Post stations located within the borders of modern Annaka were: Itahana-shuku, Annaka-shuku, Matsuida-shuku, and Sakamoto-shuku.

Annaka Town was created within Usui District, Gunma Prefecture on April 1, 1889, with the creation of the modern municipalities system after the Meiji Restoration. On March 1, 1955, Annaka merged with neighboring Haraichi, Isobe and Itahana towns, and Higashiyokono, Iwanoya, Akima and Gokan villages. It was raised to city status on November 1, 1958. On March 18, 2006, the town of Matsuida, merged with Annaka. Usui District was dissolved as a result of this merger.

== Government ==
Annaka has a mayor-council form of government with a directly elected mayor and a unicameral city council of 20 members. Annaka contributes two members to the Gunma Prefectural Assembly. In terms of national politics, the city is part of Gunma 5th district of the lower house of the Diet of Japan.

== Economy ==
Annaka is a regional commercial center and transportation hub. Toho Zinc operates a large plant in the city, as does Shin-Etsu Chemical.

== Education ==
Annaka has 12 public elementary schools and five public middle schools operated by the city government, and two public high schools operated by the Gunma Prefectural Board of Education. There is also one private combined middle/high school.

== Transportation ==
=== Railway ===
JR East – Hokuriku Shinkansen

- Annaka-Haruna

JR East – Shin'etsu Main Line

- Annaka - Isobe - Matsuida - Nishi-Matsuida - Yokokawa

=== Highway ===
- Jōshin-etsu Expressway – Masuida-Myogi IC, Usui-Karuizawa IC, Yokogawa SA
- National Route 18

== Local attractions ==
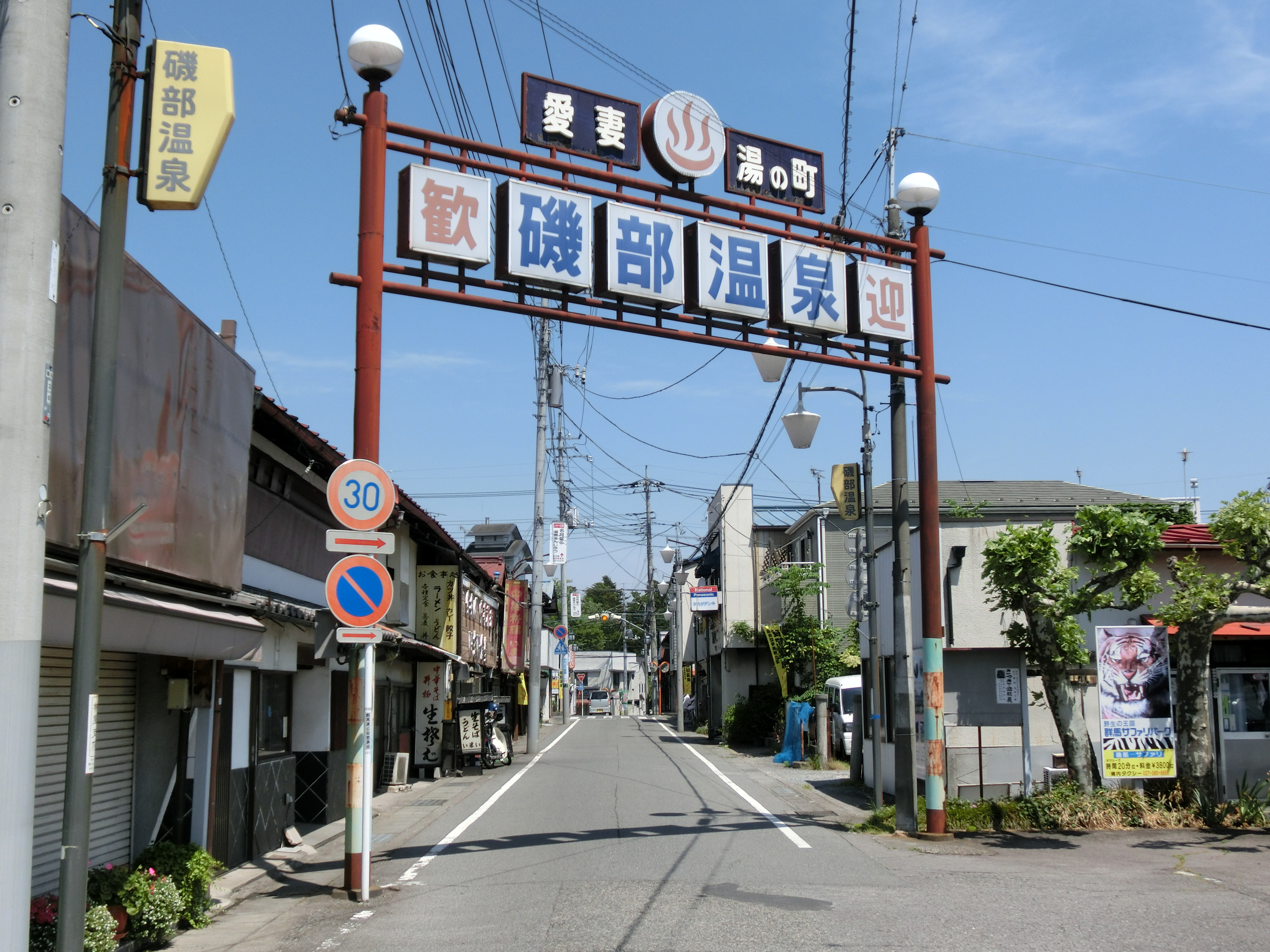
Entrance to Isobe Onsen

- Asazuma Art Museum
- Isobe Onsen
- Kirizumi Onsen
- Ruins of Matsuida Castle
- Myogi Sanroku Art Museum
- Usui Pass
- Usui Pass Railway Heritage Park
- Yanase Futagozuka Kofun, a National Historic Site

== Sister cities ==
- Kimberley, British Columbia, Canada, friendship city since December 16, 2005

== Notable people from Annaka ==
- Yuma Anzai, professional wrestler
