= Matsuida Station =

Railway station in Annaka, Gunma Prefecture, Japan

Matsuida Station 松井田駅
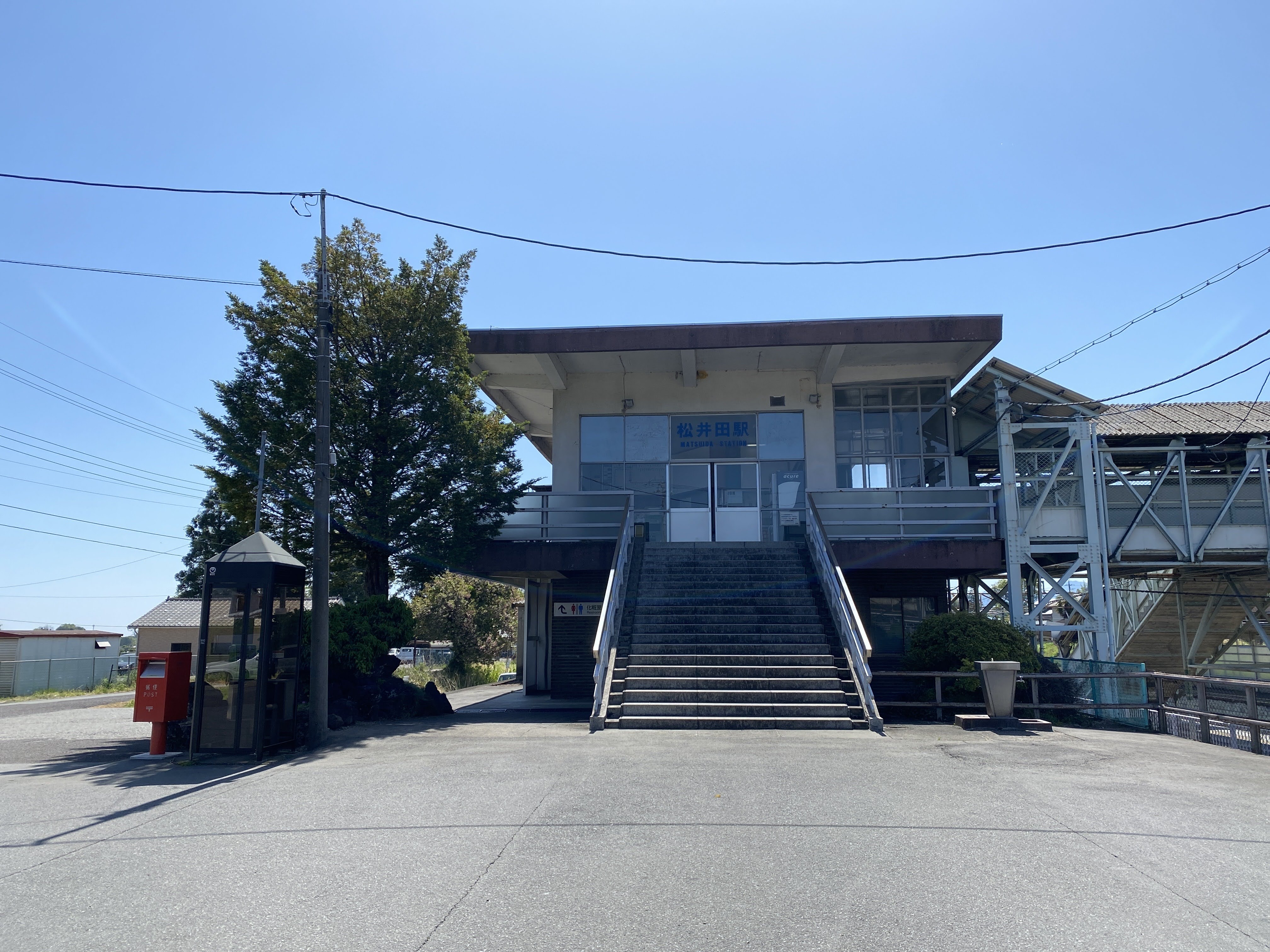
- Station building in April 2021

General information
- Location: 94-1 Matsuidamachi Yashiro, Annaka-shi, Gunma-ken 379–0225; Japan
- Coordinates: 36.3093°N 138.7978°E
- Operator: JR East
- Line: ■ Shin'etsu Line
- Distance: 22.7 km from Takasaki
- Platforms: 2 side platforms
- Tracks: 2

Other information
- Status: Unstaffed
- Website: Official website

History
- Opened: 15 October 1885

Passengers
- FY2017: 543

Services
Preceding station	JR East	Following station
Nishi-Matsuida towards Yokokawa	Shin'etsu Main Line Takasaki – Yokokawa	Isobe towards Takasaki
Location
- Location within Gunma Prefecture Location within Japan

Matsuida Station (松井田駅, Matsuida-eki) is a railway station in the city of Annaka, Gunma, Japan, operated by the East Japan Railway Company (JR East).

== Lines ==
Matsuida Station is a station on the Shin'etsu Main Line, and is located 22.7 km from the starting point of the line at Takasaki.

== Station layout ==
The station has two opposed side platforms connected to the station building by a footbridge. The station is unattended.

=== Platforms ===
1	■ Shin'etsu Main Line	for Takasaki
2	■ Shi'netsu Main Line	for Yokokawa

== History ==
Matsuida Station opened on 15 October 1885. With the privatization of the Japanese National Railways (JNR) on 1 April 1987, the station came under the control of JR East.

== Passenger statistics ==
In fiscal 2017, the station was used by an average of 543 passengers daily (boarding passengers only).

== Surrounding area ==
- Usui River
- Gunma Prefectural Matsuida High School

== See also ==
- List of railway stations in Japan
