= Matsuida, Gunma =

Dissolved municipality in Gunma prefecture, Japan

Coordinates: 36°19′N 138°48′E

Matsuida (松井田町, Matsuida-machi) was a town located in Usui District, Gunma Prefecture, Japan.

As of 2003, the town had an estimated population of 16,556 and a density of 94.58 persons per km^{2}. The total area was 175.05 km^{2}.

On March 18, 2006, Matsuida was merged into expanded city of An'naka.
