= 美琴 =

美琴, meaning “beautiful, musical instrument”, is a feminine name, may refer to:

- Chan May-Kan (陈美琴; 1930–1972), Hong Kong film actress who is Zao Wou-Ki’s second wife
- Hsiao Bi-khim (born 1971), Taiwanese politician and diplomat
- Mikoto, Japanese feminine given name
- Ren Meiqin (任美琴; born 1965), Member of the 11th National People's Congress
- Zhang Meiqin (張美琴), a character in the television series The Spirits of Love
