= Yanase Futagozuka Kofun =

Kofun period burial mound in Japan

- 簗瀬二子塚古墳 (Japanese)
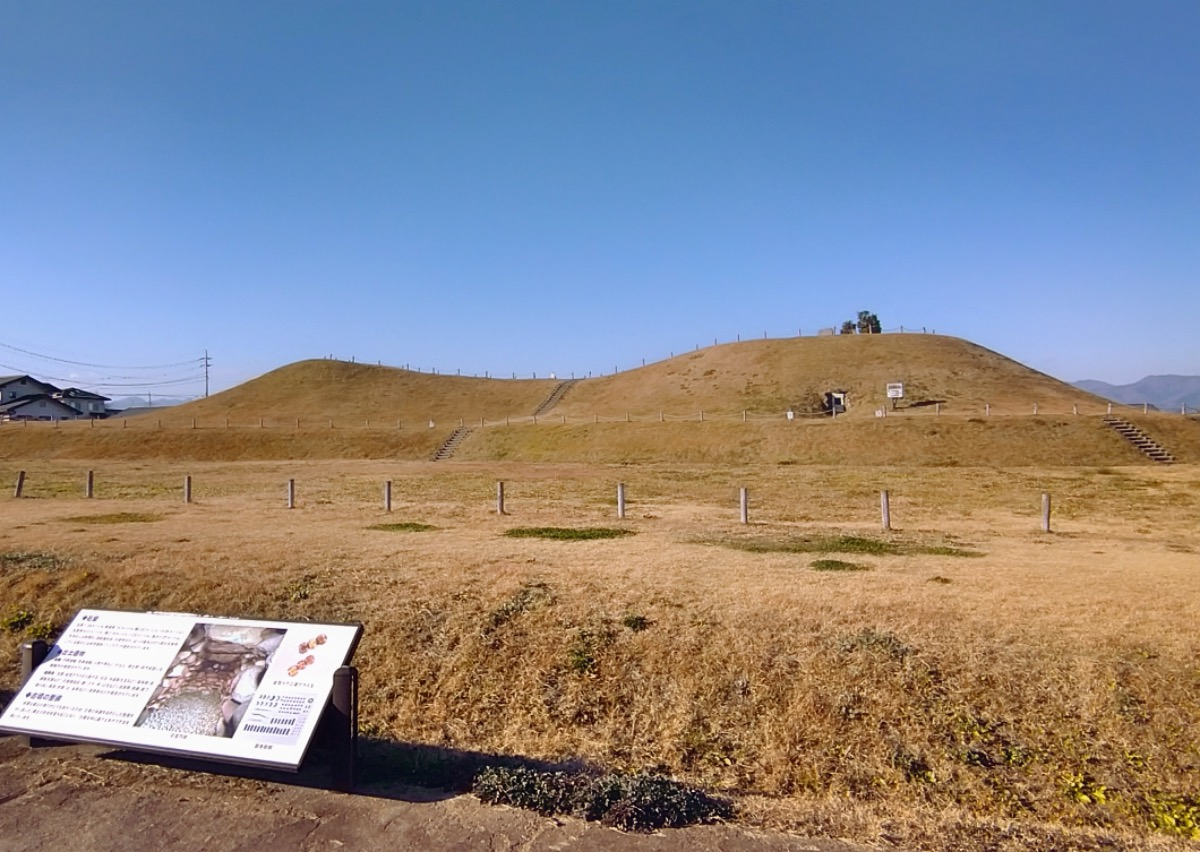
- Yanase Futagozuka Kofun

- Yanase Futagoyama Kofun Yanase Futagozuka Kofun (Japan)
- 36°18′38″N 138°51′32″E
- Type: kofun
- Periods: Kofun period
- Location: Annaka, Gunma, Japan
- Region: Kantō region

History
- Built: late 6th century AD

Site notes
- Public access: Yes (Park)

The Yanase Futagozuka Kofun (簗瀬二子塚古墳) is a Kofun period burial mound located in the Yanase neighborhood the city of Annaka, Gunma Prefecture in the northern Kantō region of Japan. It was designated a National Historic Site of Japan in 2018, with the area under protection expanded in 2026. It is the only zenpō-kōen-fun (前方後円墳)), which is shaped like a keyhole, having one square end and one circular end, when viewed from above, found along the Usui River and one of the largest in Gunma Prefecture.

== Overview ==
The Yanase Futagozuka Kofun is located on a river terrace on the left bank of Usui River in western Gunma Prefecture. It was excavated in 1879, at which time the burial chamber was opened and various grave goods were recovered. It was re-surveyed in 1957 and re-excavated in 1995.

The tumulus is constructed with two tiers and is orientated towards the west. The surface was covered in fukiishi revetment stones and rows of cylindrical haniwa were found on top and on the terrace between the two tiers. Other types of haniwa shaped as human figures, horses, etc. were also found. The tumulus was surrounded by a double moat. The burial facility is a double-chambered horizontal-entry stone burial chamber in the posterior circular section, opening to the south. It is an older type of stone chamber, exhibiting construction methods similar to the earlier vertical-entry stone chambers, with walls made of river stones painted in vermillion, and with the ceiling made from a tuff megalith. The total length of the chamber is 11.54 meters, with the chamber proper measuring 4.07 by 2.16-2.32 meters with a height of 2.2 meters, and an entrance passage 7.47 meters long. Numerous grave goods have been unearthed from within the chamber.

From the construction and type of grave goods it is estimated that this tumulus dates from the beginning of the 6th century AD in the late Kofun period. The grave goods included fragments of iron swords and weapons, armor, horse fittings, and a large number of beads, magatama, and other items of jewelry, as well as Sue ware pottery. Some 1240 artifacts were designated as an important cultural property of Annaka City in 2012.

The tumulus is now open to the public as part of a historic park with a small museum, the Yanase Futagozuka Tomb Guidance Building (梁瀬二子塚古墳ガイダンス棟), but access to the stone chamber is restricted.

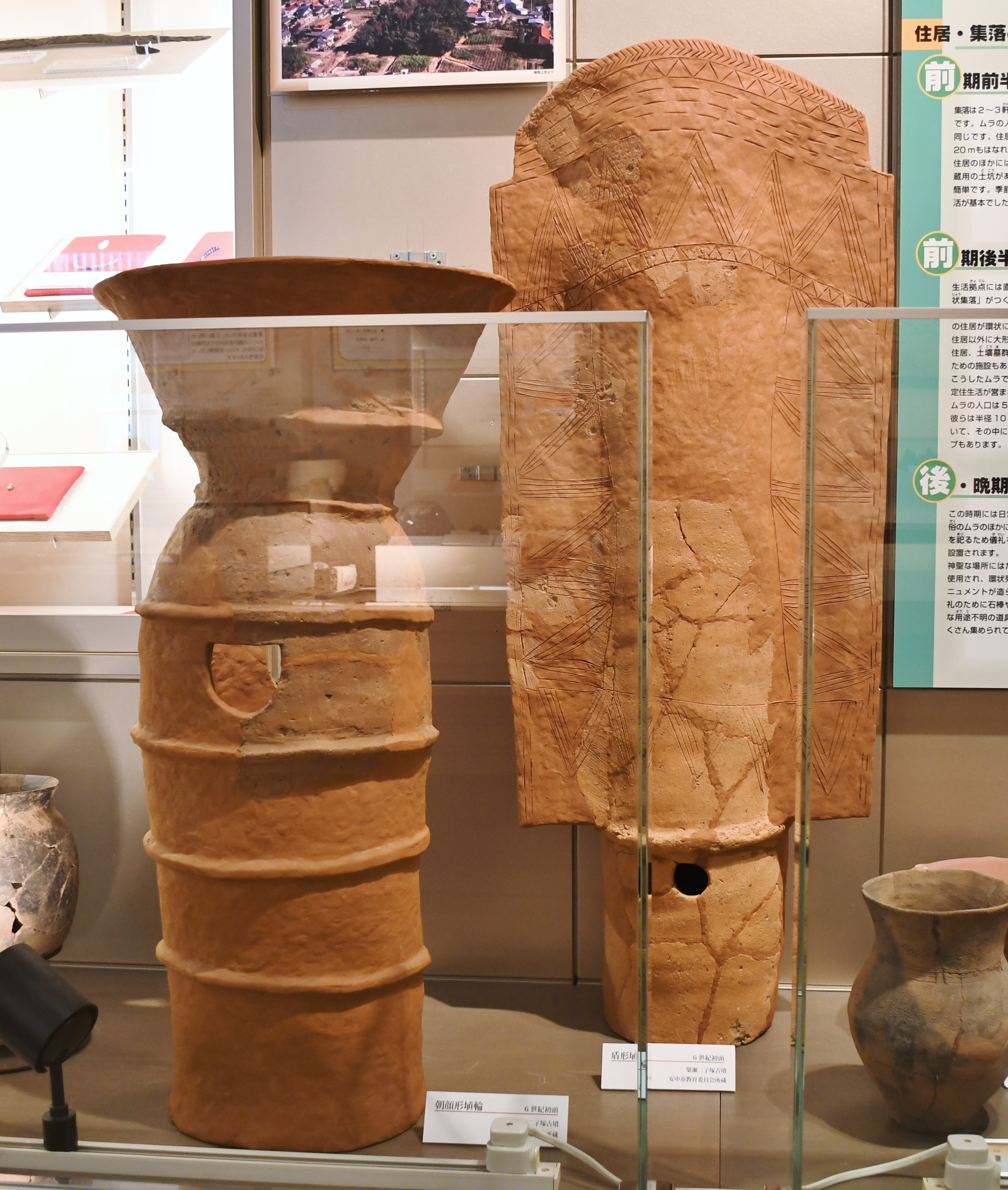
Haniwa from the Yanase Futagozuka Kofun

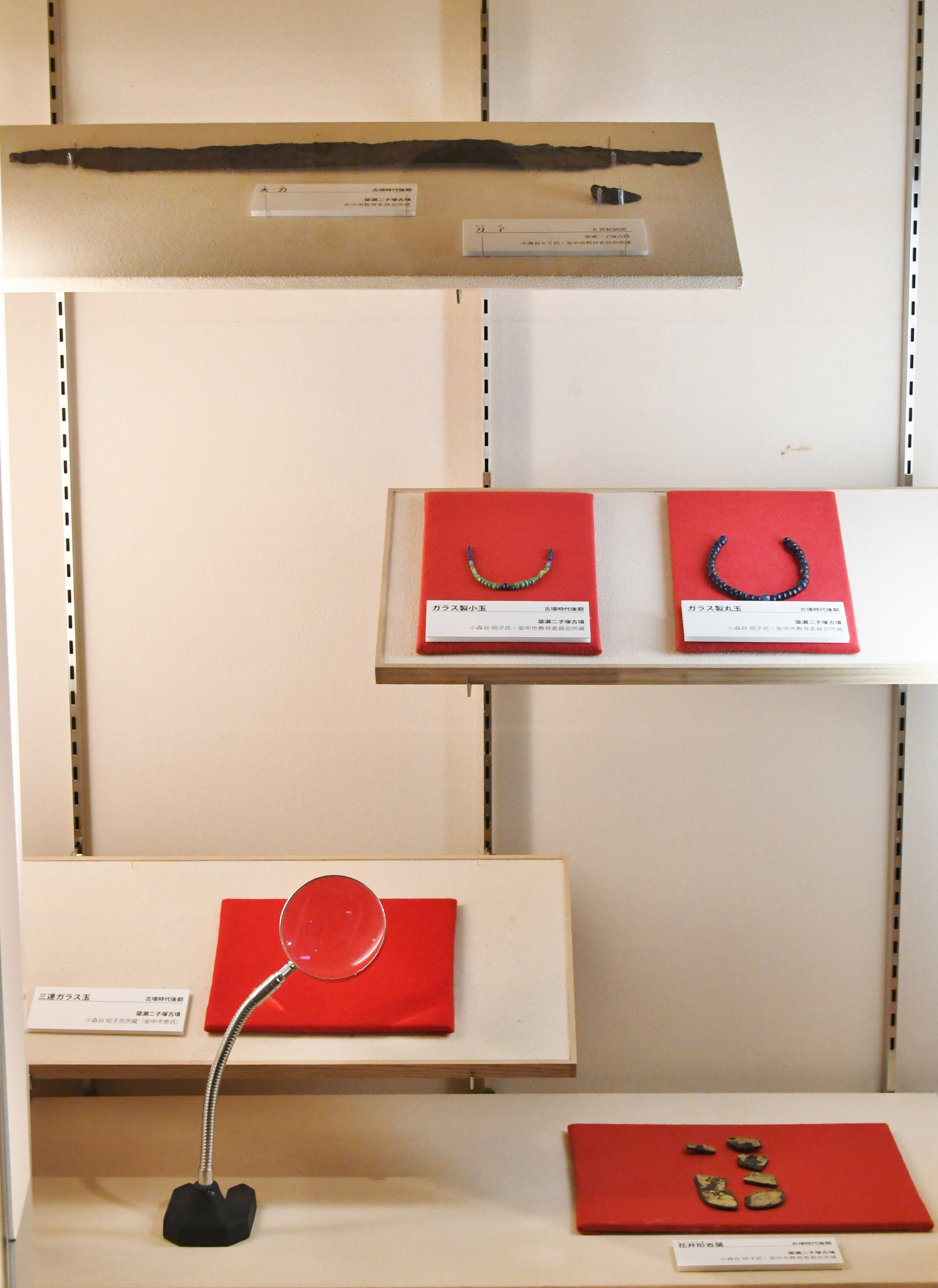
Artifacts from the Yanase Futagozuka Kofun

Overall length
80 meters
Posterior circular portion
50 meters diameter x 8 meters high, 2 tiers
Anterior rectangular portion
60 meters wide x 7 meters high, 2 tiers

The tumulus is approximately 1.9 kilometers northeast of the JR East Isobe Station on the Shinetsu Main Line.

== See also ==
- List of Historic Sites of Japan (Gunma)
