= Nishi-Matsuida Station =

Railway station in Annaka, Gunma Prefecture, Japan

Nishi-Matsuida Station 西松井田駅
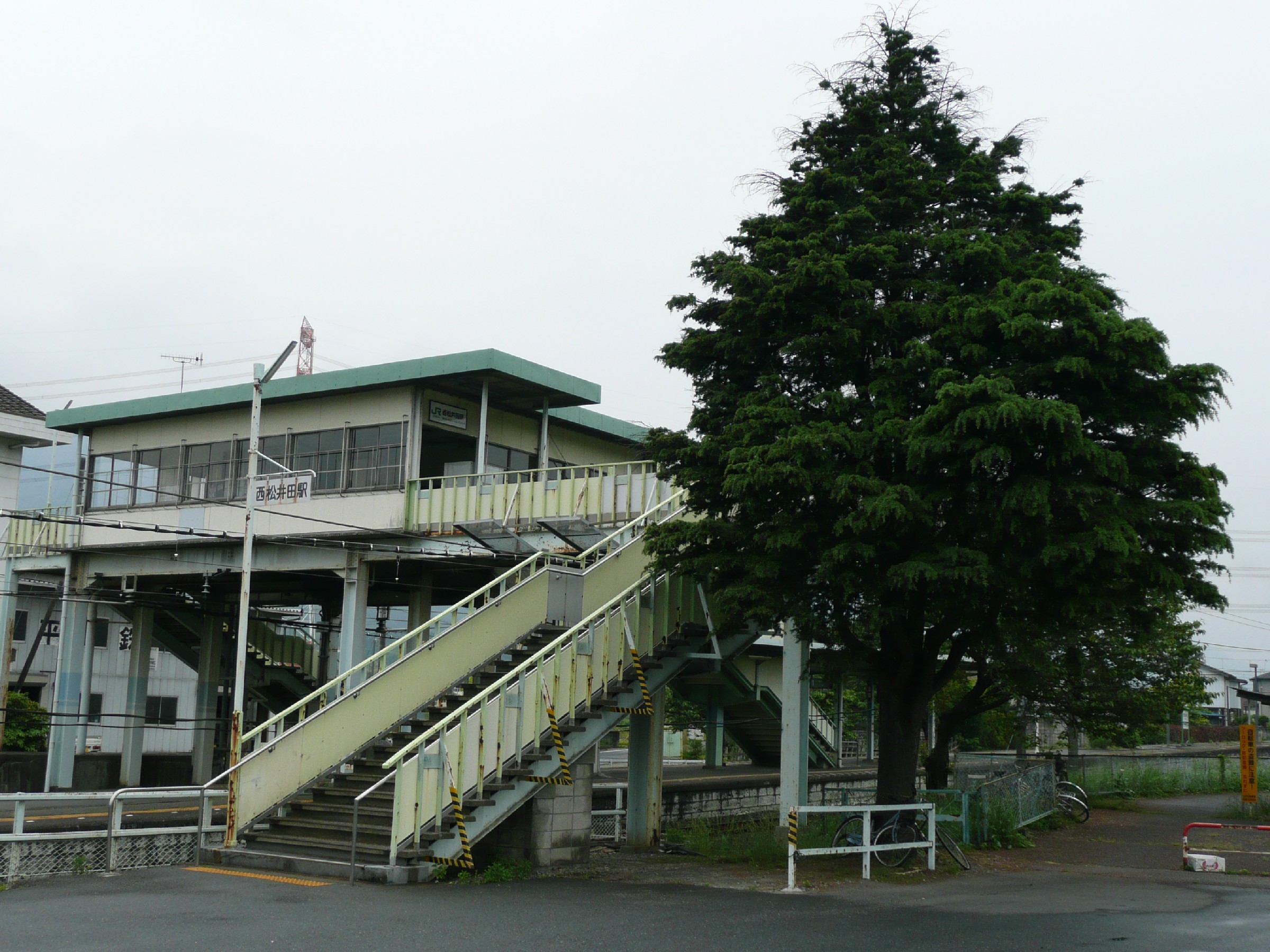
- Nishi-Matsuida Station in May 2009

General information
- Location: 476 Matsuida-machi Niibori, Annaka-shi, Gunma-ken 379–0221; Japan
- Coordinates: 36.3159°N 138.7868°E
- Operator: JR East
- Line: ■ Shin'etsu Line
- Distance: 23.9 km from Takasaki
- Platforms: 1 island platform
- Tracks: 2

Other information
- Status: Unstaffed
- Website: Official website

History
- Opened: 1 April 1965

Passengers
- FY2017: 267

Services
Preceding station	JR East	Following station
Yokokawa Terminus	Shin'etsu Main Line Takasaki – Yokokawa	Matsuida towards Takasaki
Location
- Location within Gunma Prefecture Location within Japan

Nishi-Matsuida Station (西松井田駅, Nishi-Matsuida-eki) is a railway station in the city of Annaka, Gunma, Japan, operated by the East Japan Railway Company (JR East).

== Lines ==
Nishi-Matsuida Station is a station on the Shin'etsu Main Line, and is located 23.9 km from the starting point of the line at Takasaki.

== Station layout ==
The station has a single island platform with an elevated station building located above and at a right angle to the platforms. The station is unattended.

=== Platforms ===
1	■ Shin'etsu Main Line	for Yokokawa
2	■ Shin'etsu Main Line	for Takasaki

== History ==
Nishi-Matsuida Station opened on 1 April 1965. With the privatization of the Japanese National Railways (JNR) on 1 April 1987, the station came under the control of JR East.

== Passenger statistics ==
In fiscal 2017, the station was used by an average of 267 passengers daily (boarding passengers only).

== Surrounding area ==
- Former Matsuida Town Hall
- Matsuida Post Office

== See also ==
- List of railway stations in Japan
