= Annaka-shuku =

Coordinates: 36.3243°N 138.8894°E

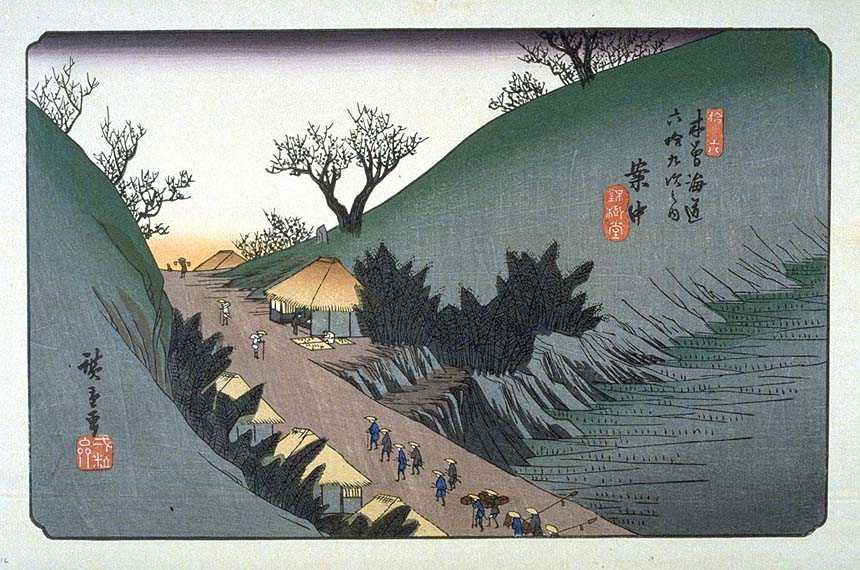
Hiroshige's print of Annaka-shuku, part of The Sixty-nine Stations of the Kiso Kaidō series

Annaka-shuku (安中宿, Annaka-shuku) was the fifteenth of the sixty-nine stations of the Nakasendō. It is located in the present-day city of Annaka, Gunma Prefecture, Japan. Batō Kan'on (馬頭漢音 horsehead gods) lined the way to the post town.

== Neighboring Post Towns ==
Nakasendō
Itahana-shuku - Annaka-shuku - Matsuida-shuku
