= Mikoto =

Mikoto (命, 美琴) is a unisex Japanese given name. It may refer to:

== People ==
=== Women ===
- Mikoto Umezu (梅津 美琴; born 2007), Japanese women's professional shogi player

=== Men ===
- Mikoto Usui, Japanese-born American development economist and scholar.

== Fictional characters ==
- Female:
  - Yamato Mikoto, a character in Is It Wrong to Try to Pick Up Girls in a Dungeon?
  - Mikoto Minagi, a character in the anime My-HiME
  - Mikoto Misaka, a character in the anime Toaru Majutsu no Index
  - Mikoto Uchiha, mother to Sasuke Uchiha and Itachi Uchiha, a character in the popular manga/anime series Naruto
  - Mikoto Urabe, a character in the anime "Nazo no Kanojo X"
  - Mikoto Suo, a character in the manga and anime School Rumble
  - Mikoto, the Genome pseudo-sister to Zidane Tribal in Final Fantasy IX.
  - Mikoto, the Queen of Hoshido, a character in Fire Emblem Fates
  - Mikoto, a villain in the anime/manga Flame of Recca
  - Mikoto, a character in the video game "Rune Factory: Tides of Destiny"
  - Mikoto, a character in the game Samurai Showdown
  - Mikoto Yoroi, a character in the visual novel Muv-Luv
- Undefined:
  - MEIKA Mikoto, a character representing a voicebank of the same name for the vocal synthesizer VOCALOID5
- Male:
  - Kayano Mikoto, a prisoner in the online music project MILGRAM
  - Mikoto Inugami from Inu x Boku SS
  - Mikoto Nakadai/AbareKiller, an anti-hero from Bakuryuu Sentai Abaranger
  - Mikoto Sayama, a character in the light novel The Ending Chronicle
  - Mikoto Suno from Eyeshield 21
  - Mikoto Suoh, a character in the anime K

== See also ==
- Wakamikenu no Mikoto
