= Sakamoto Dam (Gunma) =

Dam in Gunma Prefecture, Japan

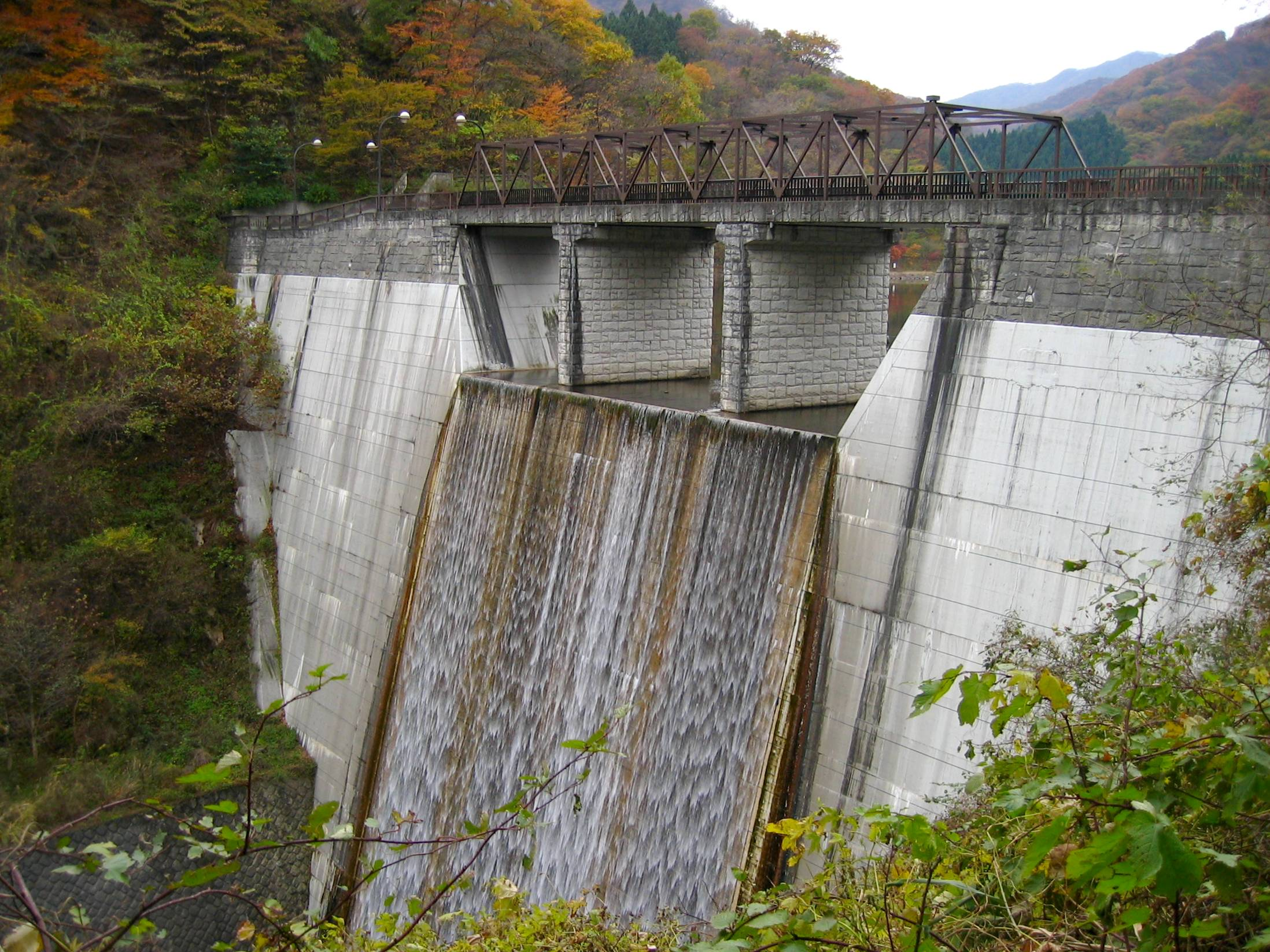
- Interactive map of Sakamoto Dam
- Location: Gunma Prefecture, Japan.
- Coordinates: 36°21′12″N 138°42′27.3″E
- Construction began: 1988
- Opening date: 1994; 32 years ago

Dam and spillways
- Type of dam: Gravity dam
- Impounds: Usui River
- Height: 36.3 m (119 ft)
- Length: 85 m (279 ft)

Reservoir
- Creates: Lake Usui
- Total capacity: 778,000 m^{3} (27,500,000 cu ft)
- Catchment area: 13.7 km^{2} (5.3 sq mi)
- Surface area: 7 hectares (17 acres)

Sakamoto Dam is a dam in the Gunma Prefecture of Japan. The lake formed by the dam is known as Lake Usui. Originally built as a sediment control dam in 1958, the dam was rebuilt by the Gunma Prefecture Government. Construction on the modern dam began in 1988. The dam is near features like Usui Bridge and Apt's Road

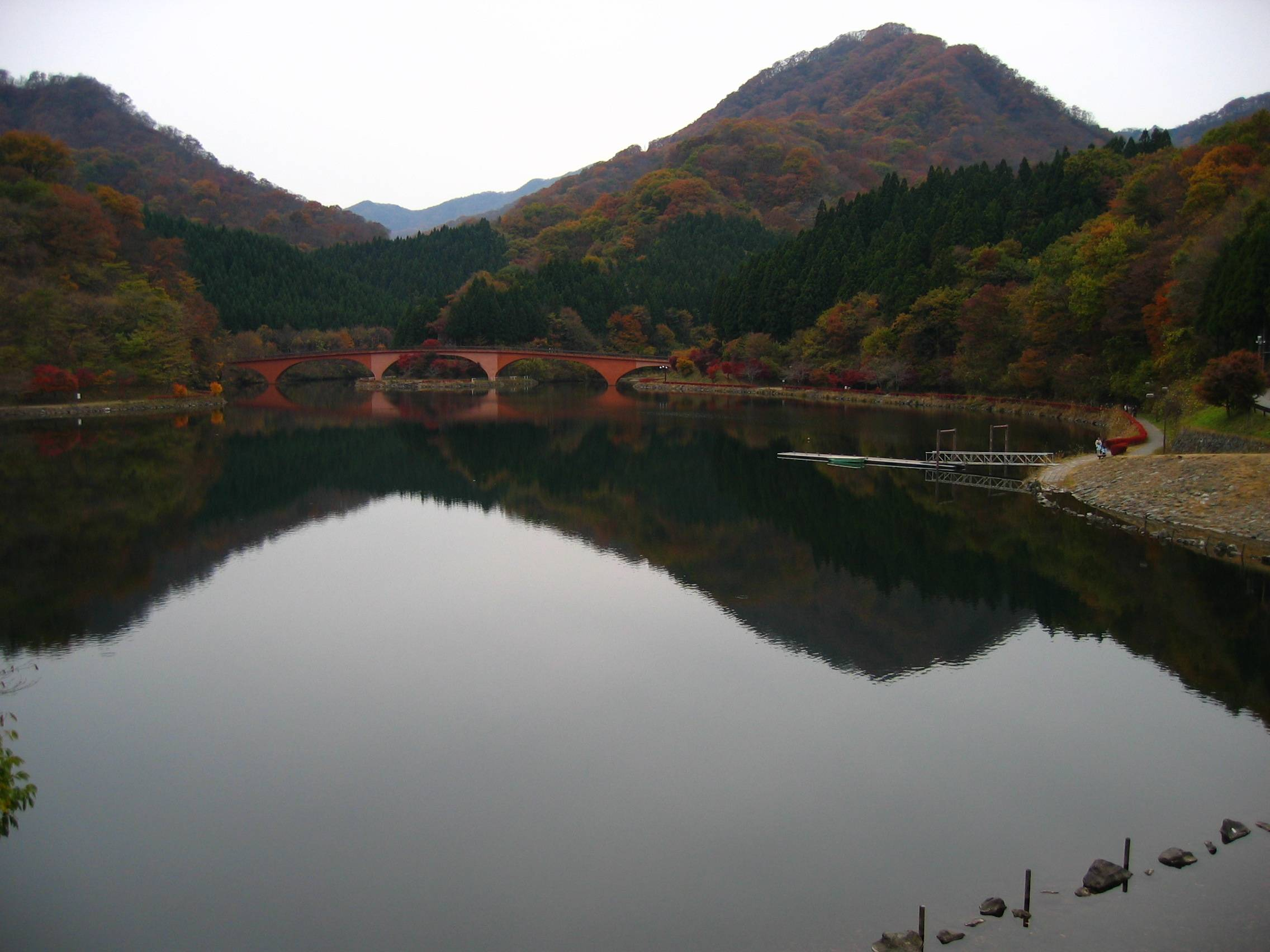
Lake Usui
