= Usui (surname) =

Usui (written 碓井, 碓氷, 臼井, 笛吹, 薄井 or 卯水) is a Japanese surname.

Notable people with it include :

- Hana Usui (born 1973), Japanese artist
- Hideo Usui (born 1939), Japanese politician
- Hirotaka Usui (臼井 弘貴; born 1980), Japanese football manager
- Hiroyuki Usui (born 1953), former Japanese football player and manager
- Hitoshi Usui (born 1988), Japanese football player
- Junichi Usui (born 1957), retired Japanese long jumper
- Kaoru Usui (1916–2010), Japanese photographer
- Kempei Usui (born 1987), Japanese footballer
- Kohei Usui (born 1979), Japanese football player
- Masahiro Usui (born 1991), Japanese actor
- Masako Usui (born 1968), Japanese newscaster
- Mikao Usui (1865–1926), religious teacher, founder of Reiki
- Mikoto Usui, Japanese economist
- Rie Usui (born 1989), Japanese women's footballer
- Usui Sadamitsu, warrior of the mid-Heian period
- Yoshimi Usui (1905–1987), Japanese author and critic
- Yoshito Usui (1958–2009), Japanese manga artist

== Fictional characters ==
- Takumi Usui, a character in anime and manga series Maid Sama!
- Kazuyoshi Usui or Switch, a character in anime and manga series Sket Dance
- Horokeu Usui or Horohoro, a character in anime and manga series Shaman King
- Uonuma Usui, a character in anime and manga series Rurouni Kenshin
- Kagerou Usui, a character in the anime and manga series Sayonara Zetsubou Sensei
- Ukonzaemon Usui, better known as "Great Shinobi Owl," a major antagonist of the video game Sekiro: Shadows Die Twice
- Abuto Usui, from Shinkansen Henkei Robo Shinkalion Z
