= Isobe Station (Gunma) =

Railway station in Annaka, Gunma Prefecture, Japan

Isobe Station 磯部駅
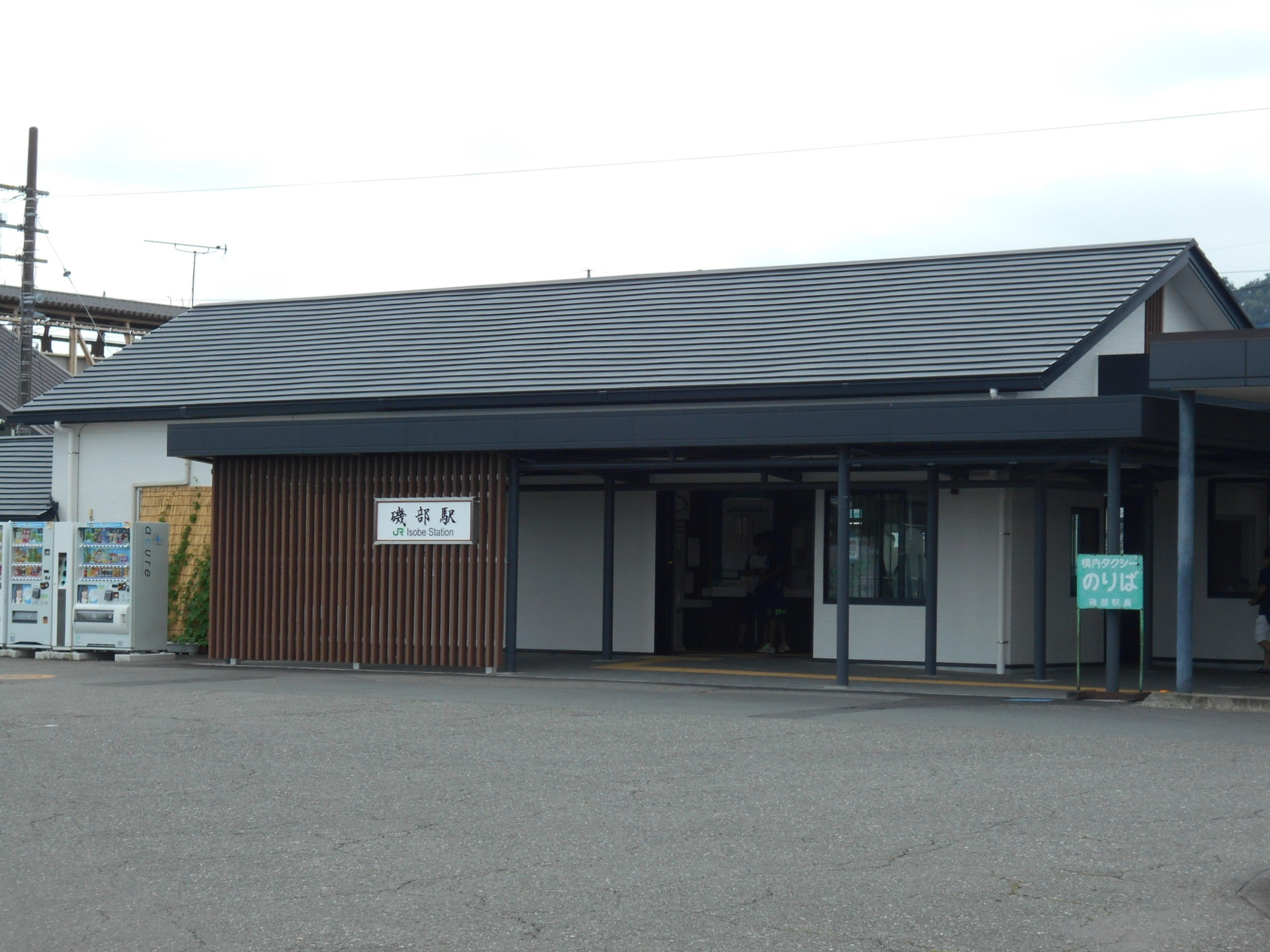
- Isobe Station in July 2016

General information
- Location: 1-17 Isobe, Annaka-shi, Gunma-ken 379–0127; Japan
- Coordinates: 36°17′55″N 138°50′58″E
- Operator: JR East
- Line: ■ Shin'etsu Line
- Distance: 17.6 km from Takasaki
- Platforms: 2 side platforms
- Tracks: 2

Other information
- Status: Staffed (Midori no Madoguchi )
- Website: Official website

History
- Opened: 15 October 1885

Passengers
- FY2019: 1060

Services
Preceding station	JR East	Following station
Matsuida towards Yokokawa	Shin'etsu Main Line Takasaki – Yokokawa	Annaka towards Takasaki
Location
- Location within Gunma Prefecture Location within Japan

Isobe Station (磯部駅, Isobe-eki) is a railway station in the city of Annaka, Gunma, Japan, operated by the East Japan Railway Company (JR East).

== Lines ==
Isobe Station is a station on the Shin'etsu Main Line, and is located 17.6 km from the starting point of the line at Takasaki.

== Station layout ==
The station has two opposed side platforms connected to the station building by a footbridge. The station has a Midori no Madoguchi staffed ticket office.

=== Platforms ===
1	■ Shin'etsu Main Line	for Takasaki
2	■ Shin'etsu Main Line	for Yokokawa

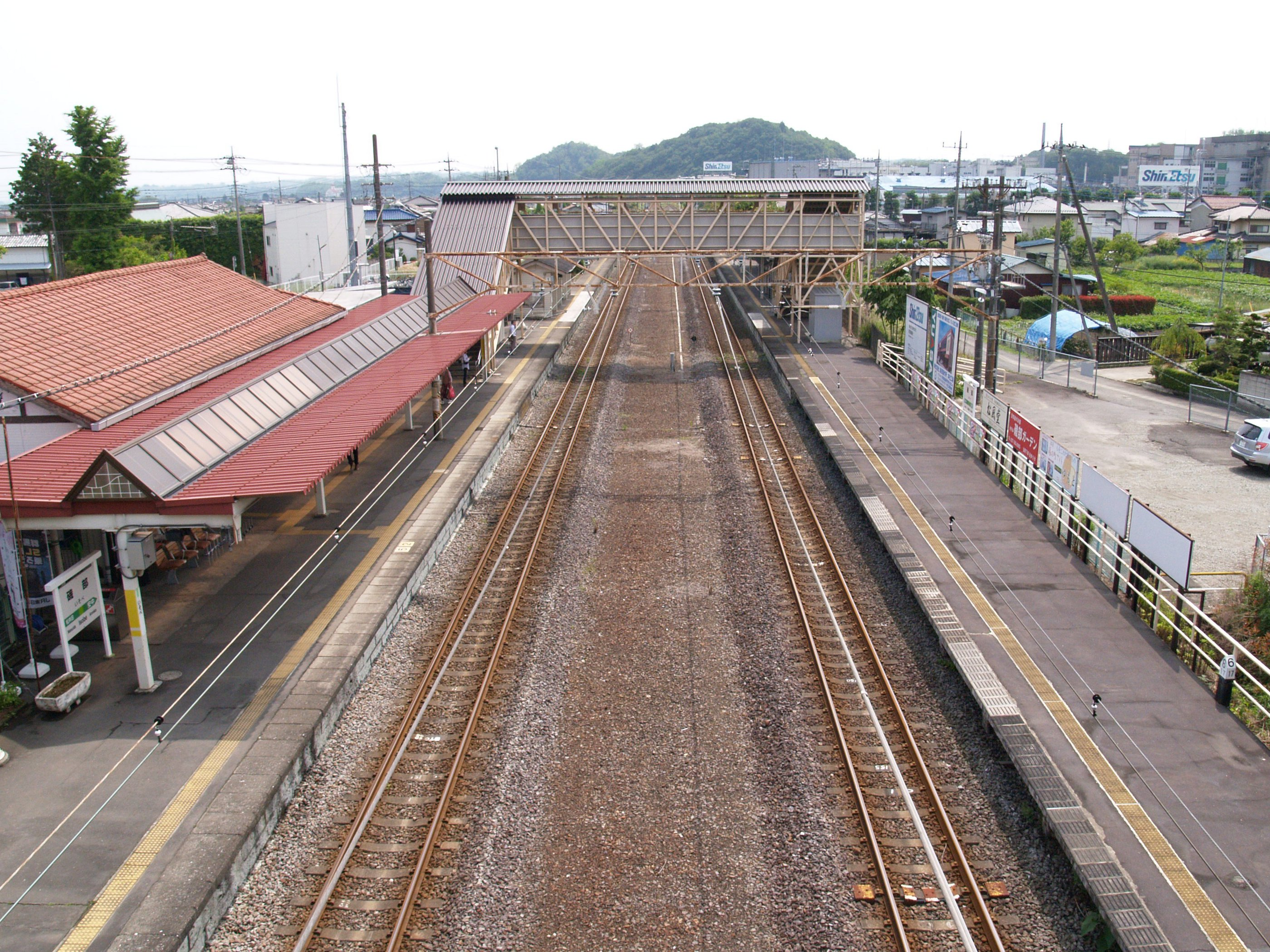
The platforms in June 2012

== History ==
Isobe Station opened on 15 October 1885. With the privatization of the Japanese National Railways (JNR) on 1 April 1987, the station came under the control of JR East.

== Passenger statistics ==
In fiscal 2019, the station was used by an average of 1060 passengers daily (boarding passengers only).

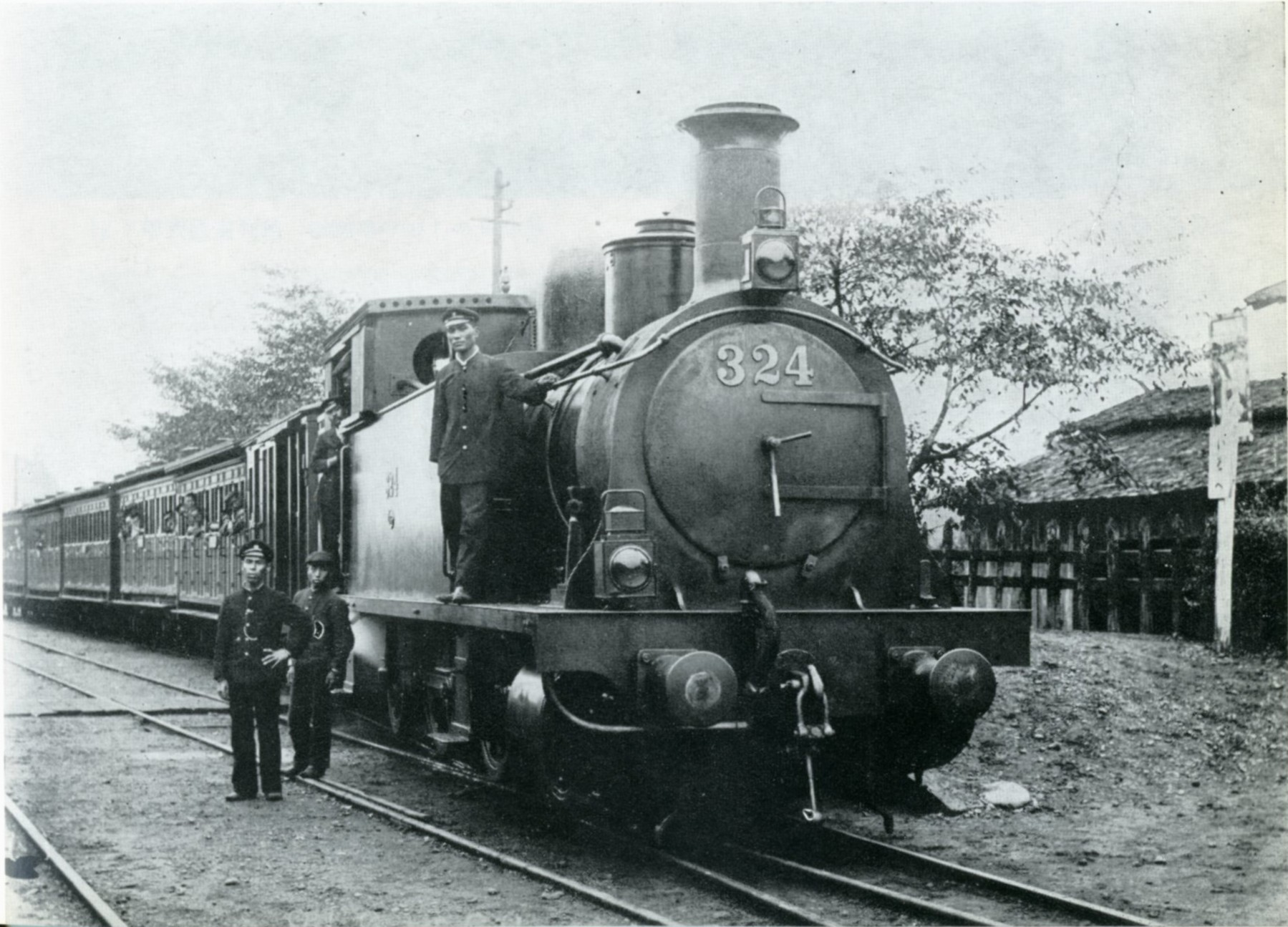
A JGR steam locomotive at the station around 1901

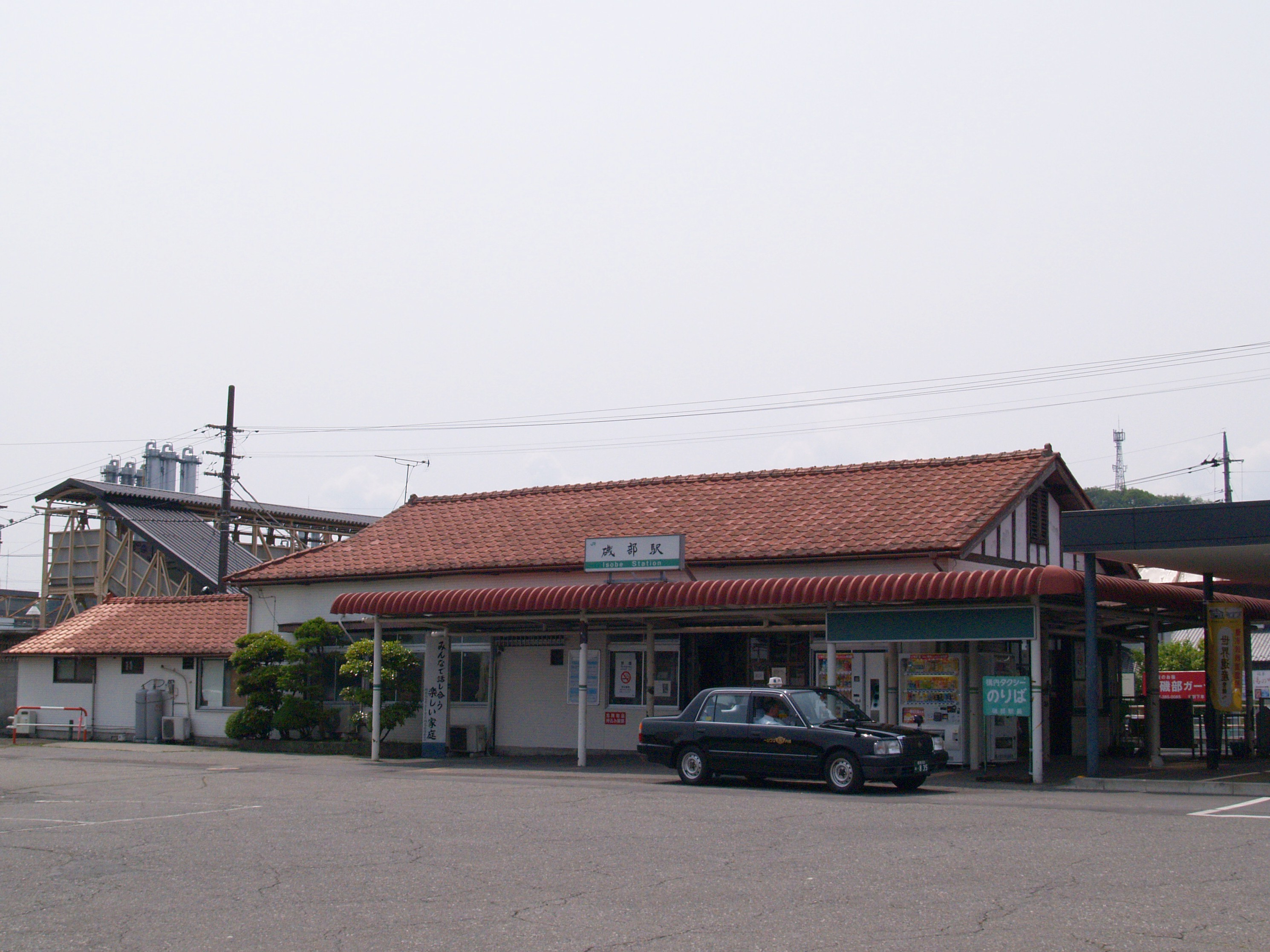
The station building in June 2012 before rebuilding

== Surrounding area ==
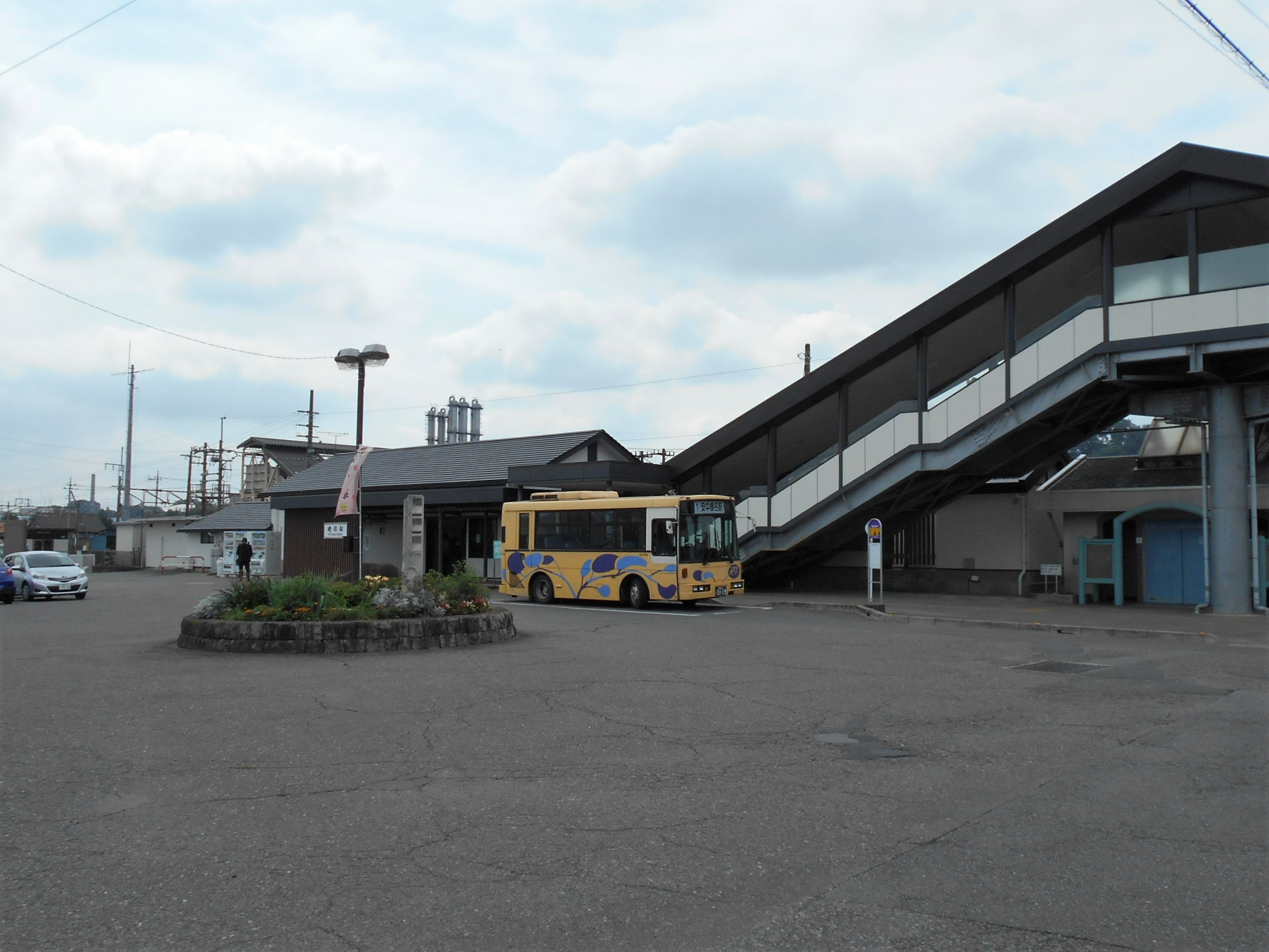
The station forecourt in July 2016

- Usui River
- Isobe Onsen
- Isobe Post Office
- Shin-Etsu Chemical Gunma Branch

== See also ==
- List of railway stations in Japan
