= Koki 200 =

Type of flatcar in Japan

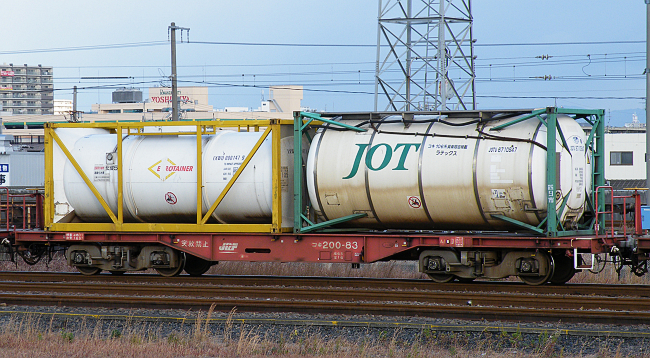
JRF type koki 200 at Nagoya Freight Terminal Sta., Nagoya city, Japan.

The Koki 200 is a type of container flatcar operated by JR Freight, designed to haul two 20-foot tank containers or one 40-foot container. The first cars of this type were delivered in 1999, and have a capacity of 48 tonnes with an overall length of 15m. The cars are designed to carry two containers up to 24 tons each or a single container of up to 30.48 tons. They are unable to load the domestic 12 foot Japanese containers. All cars in the series are painted red with gray trucks.
