= Toho Zinc =

Japanese manufacturer of Zinc related products

Toho Zinc Co., Ltd.
- Native name: 東邦亜鉛株式会社
- Company type: Public KK
- Traded as: TYO: 5707
- ISIN: JP3599000001
- Industry: Non-ferrous metals
- Founded: February 27, 1937; 89 years ago
- Headquarters: Marunouchi, Chiyoda-ku, Tokyo 100-8207, Japan
- Key people: Kimiyasu Marusaki (President)
- Products: Zinc; Lead; Silver; Sulfur; Electronic components; Machine parts
- Services: Exploration and development of non-ferrous metal resources; Recycling services
- Revenue: ▼JPY 114 billion (FY 2016) (US$ 1 billion) (FY 2016)
- Net income: ▲JPY 8.8 billion (FY 2016) (US$ 81 million) (FY 2016)
- Number of employees: 1,089 (consolidated, as of March 31, 2017)
- Website: Official website

Toho Zinc Co., Ltd. (東邦亜鉛株式会社, Tōhō Aen Kabushiki-gaisha) is a Japanese manufacturer of zinc related products. Established in 1937, it smelts nonferrous metals such as lead and zinc and produces electronic components. There are seven branches in Japan and two branches in China, in Hong Kong and Shanghai. The company was responsible for cadmium poisoning on Tsushima Island in the late twentieth century.

The company is Japan's third-biggest producer of zinc.

== Operations ==
Toho Zinc has four manufacturing sites in Japan:

- Annaka smelter and refinery with zinc smelting and refining operations
- Chigirishima smelter and refinery with lead smelting and refining operations
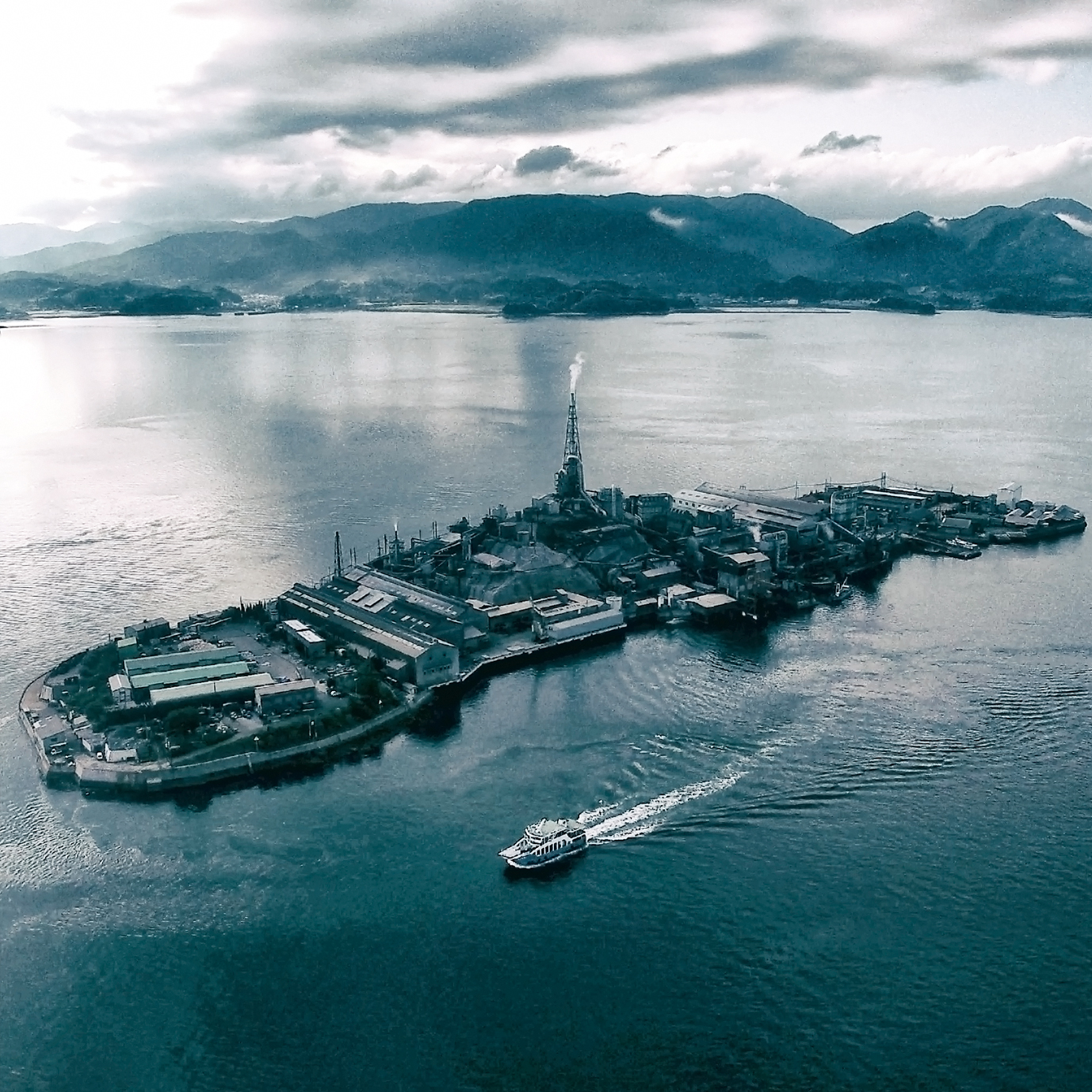
  Toho Zonc smelting plant on Chigirishima island
- Onahama smelter and refinery recycling operations
- Fujioka Works at which electronic components and materials are produced
