= Nakagi Dam =

Dam in Gunma Prefecture, Japan

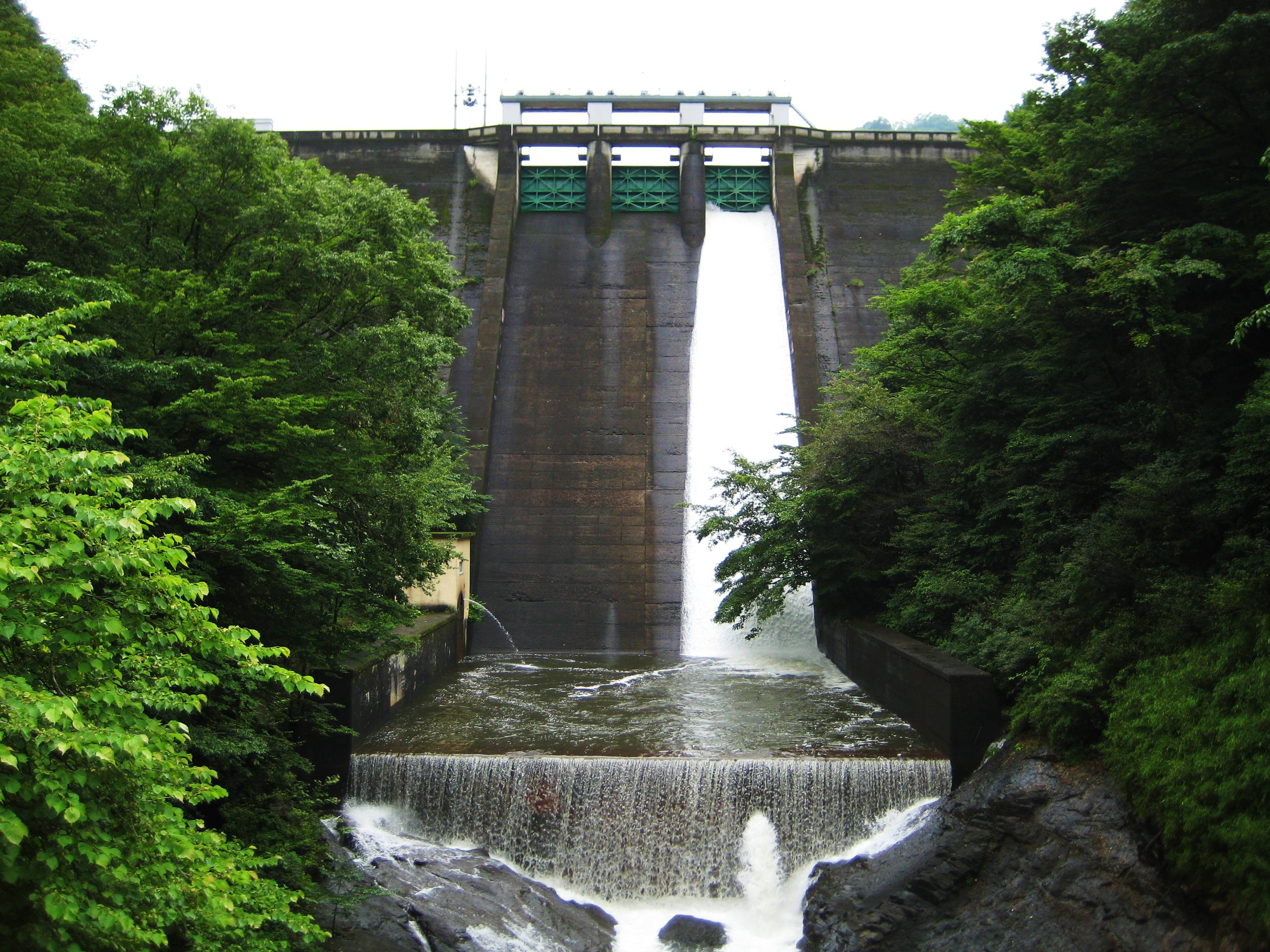
- Interactive map of Nakagi Dam
- Location: Annaki, Gunma Prefecture, Japan.
- Coordinates: 36°19′07″N 138°44′43″E
- Construction began: 1951
- Opening date: 1959

Dam and spillways
- Type of dam: Gravity
- Height: 41 m (135 ft)
- Length: 148.1 m (486 ft)

Reservoir
- Total capacity: 1,600,000 m^{3} (57,000,000 cu ft)
- Catchment area: 13.1 km^{2} (5.1 sq mi)
- Surface area: 13.6 hectares

Nakagi Dam is a dam near Annaki, in the Gunma Prefecture of Japan.

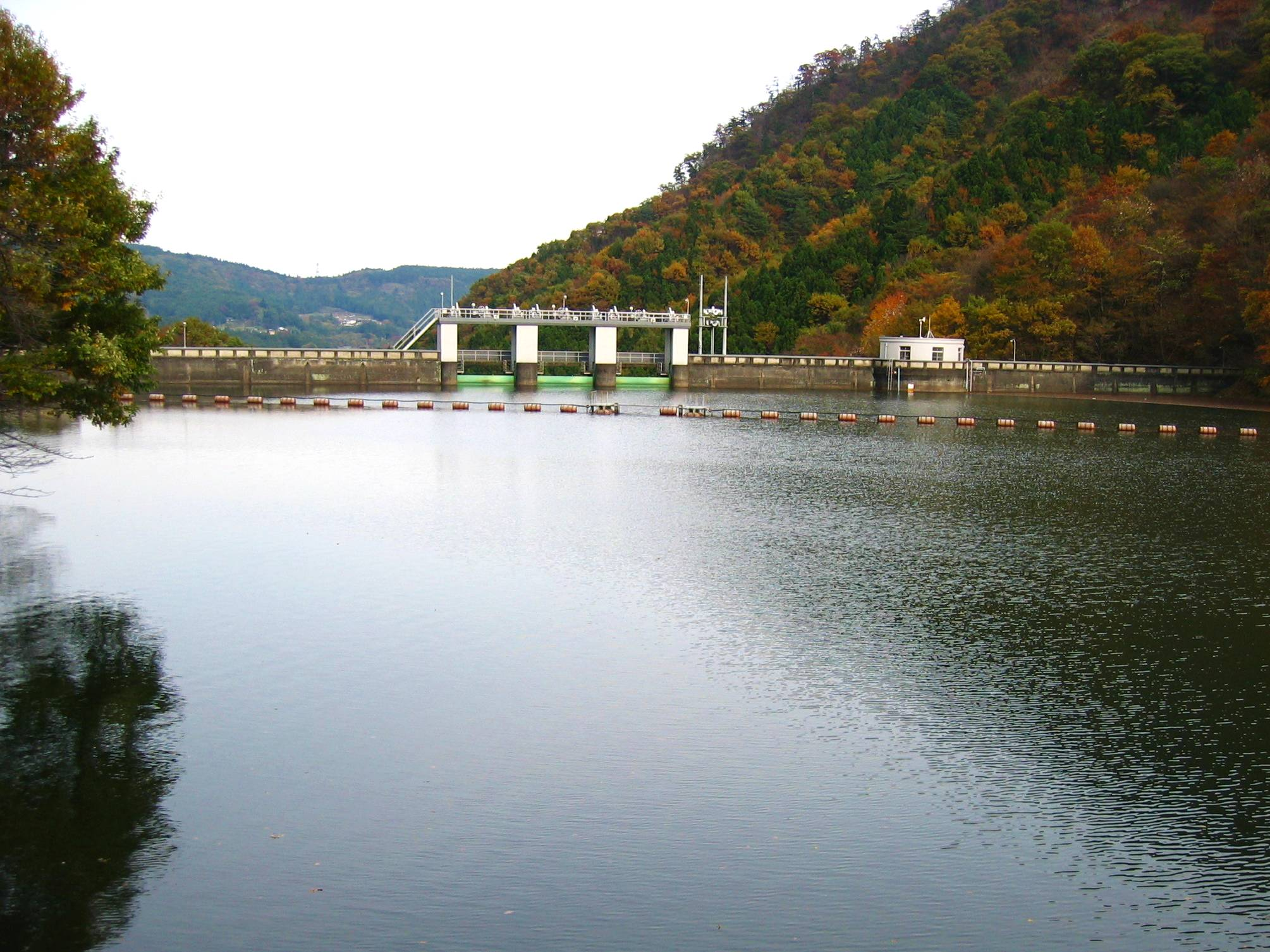
