= Usui Bridge =

Brick masonry bridge in Japan

Coordinates: 36.3581°N 138.6984°E

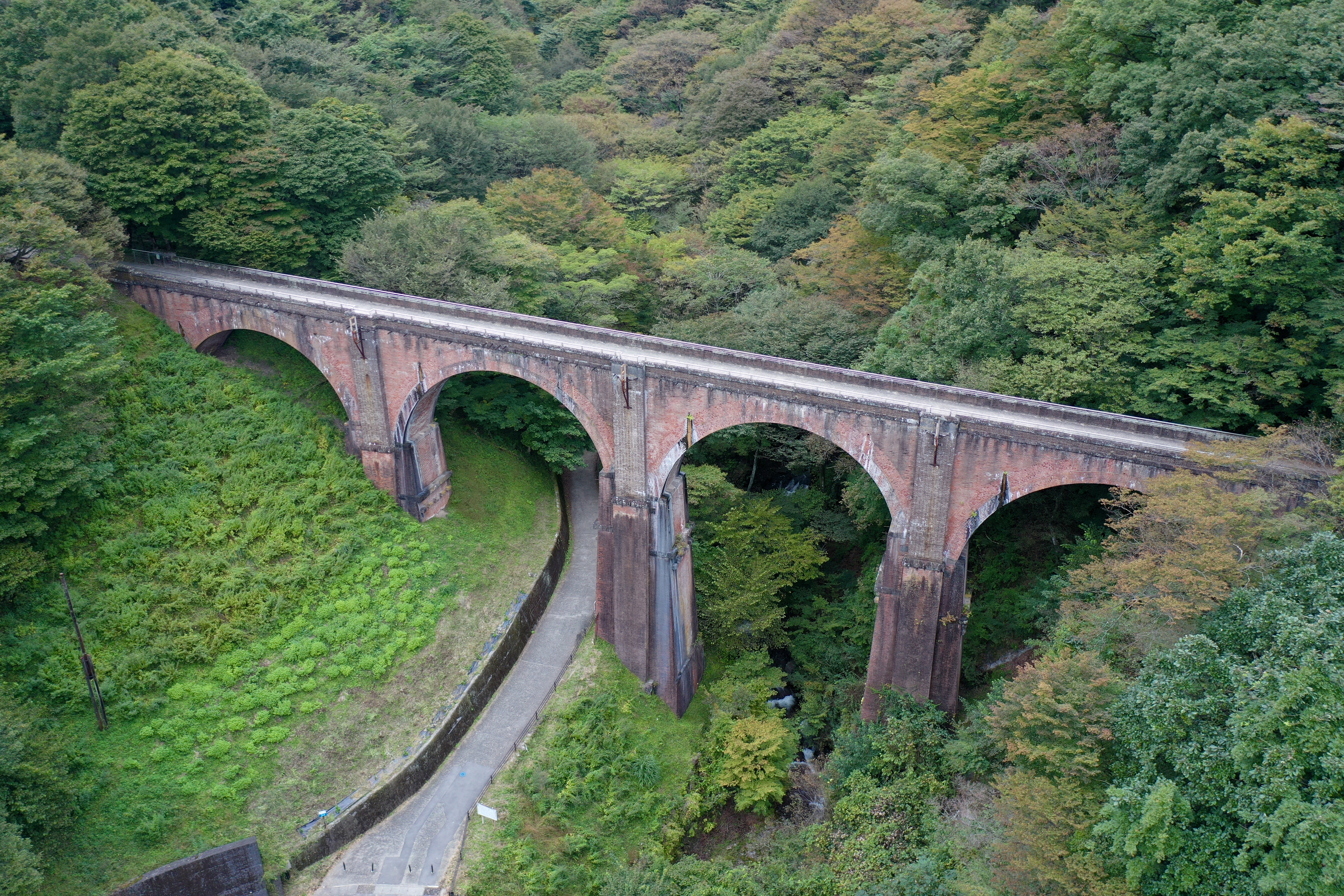
Usui bridge

Usui Bridge (Japanese: 碓氷第三橋梁, うすいだいさんきょうりょう) is the largest brick-masonry arched bridge in Japan, located over Usui river in Gunma prefecture. The bridge was built in 1892 for the Usui Railway Line to travel between Yokokawa in Gunma Prefecture and Karuizawa in Nagano Prefecture. It was designed by a British engineer Charles Assheton Whately Pownall during the Meiji era, with some of the piers reaching heights of up to 110 feet (34 m).

The total length is 91 meters (299 ft) and its construction used about 2 million bricks. Following electrification of the Shin'etsu Main Line, a new line was constructed in 1963.

In 2001, it formed part of the walkway trail.

The bridge is also called Megane bashi, meaning spectacles bridge because of its arch shape.

== Bus routes ==
- JR BUS KANTO Usui Line
  - For Karuizawa Station
  - For Yokokawa Station
    - This bus route passes through Megane-bashi bus stop located near this bridge during autumn.
