= Usui District, Gunma =

Former district in Gunma prefecture, Japan

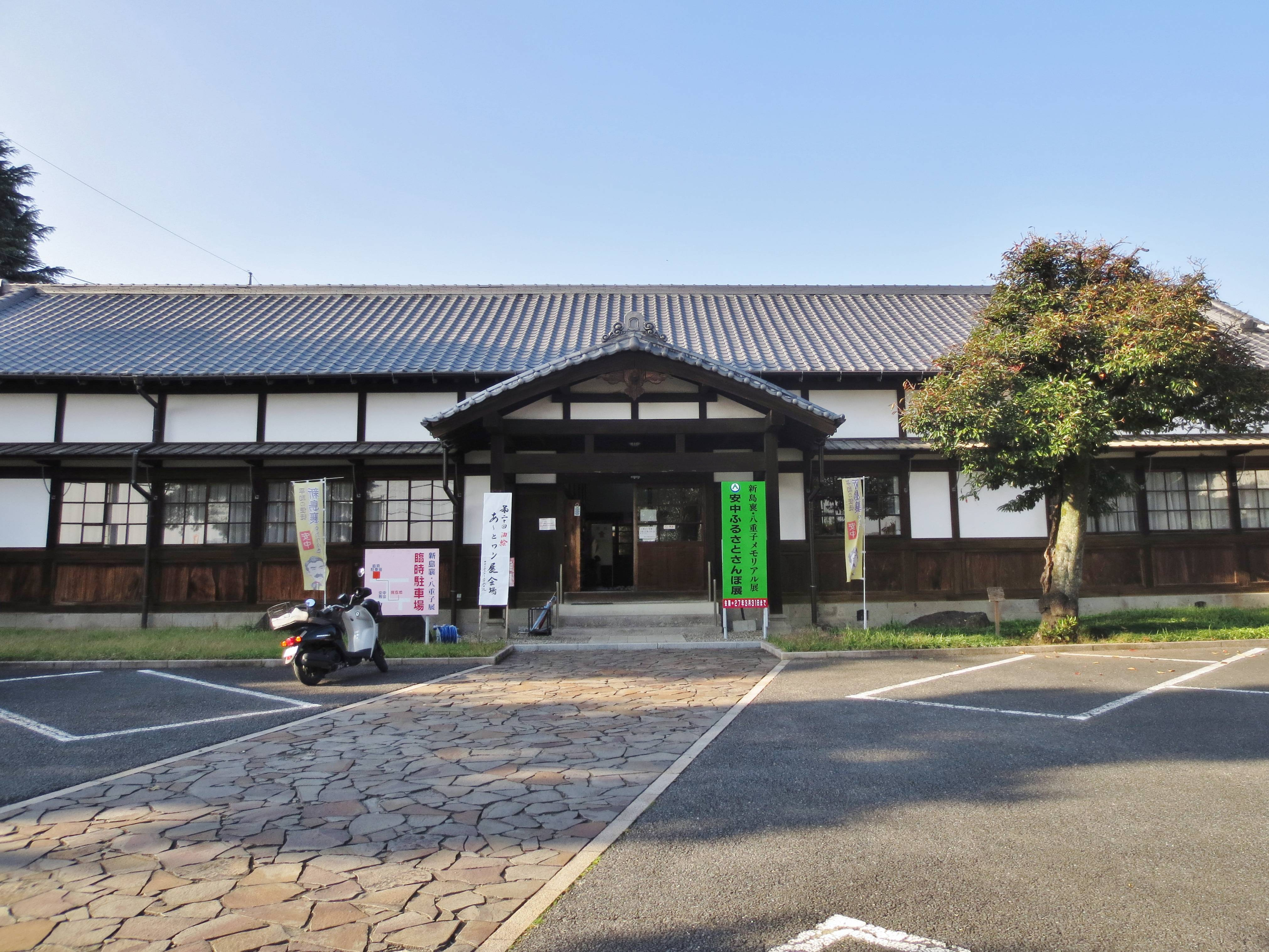
former Usui Magnistrate's office, Annaka, Gunma

Usui District (碓氷郡, Usui-gun) is a former rural district located in Gunma Prefecture, Japan. All of the city of Annaka and a tall portion of the city of Takasaki were formerly part of the district.

== History ==
Per a census conducted at the end of the Edo period, the area of Usui district contained 33 villages under the control of Annaka Domain, nine villages under Takasaki Domain, four villages under Yoshii Domain and 29 villages administered as tenryō directly by the Tokugawa shogunate. Usui District was established on December 7, 1878, and with the establishment of the municipality system on April 1, 1889 the area was organized into five towns (Annaka, Haraichi, Sakamoto, Matsuida and Itahana) and 13 villages

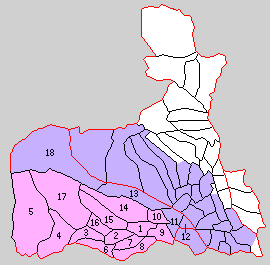
Historic Map of Usui District in 1889: purple=Takasaki city, red=Annaka city, red line=border of Usui District: 1. Annaka, 2. Haraichi, 3. Matsuida, 4. Usui, 5. Sakamoto, 6. Nishiyokono, 7. Isobe, 8. Higashiyokono, 9. Iwanoya, 10. Itahana, 11.Kawama, 12.Toyooka, 13. Satomi, 14. Akima, 15. Gokan, 16. Sukumo, 17. Hosono, 18. Ubuchi

- 1890, March 1 – Usui village was raised to town status
- 1936, July 1 – Isobe village was raised to town status
- 1954, May 3 – Usui and Sakamoto towns and Nishiyokono, Sukumo, and Hosono villages were merged into Matsuida.
- 1955, January 20 – Toyooka and Yawata villages are annexed by the city of Takasaki
- 1955, February 1 – Satomi village merges with Murota village in Gunma District to form the town of Haruna; Ubuchi village merges with Kurata village in Gunma District to form Kurabuchi village
- 1955, March 1 – Annaka town annexes the towns of Haraichi, Isobe, and Itahana, and villages of Higashiyokono, Iwanoya, Akima and Gokan
- 1958, November 1 – Annaka was raised to city status
- 2006, March 16 – Matsuida town was annexed by Annaka city, dissolving Usui District.

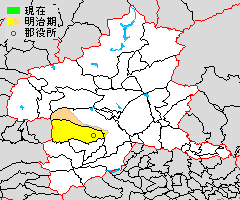
Location of Usui District within Gunma Prefecture
