= Mikoto Usui =

Japanese economist and scholar

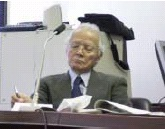

Mikoto Usui is a Japanese born, US educated (MIT Faculty of Economics, PhD program) development economist and international scholar whose life work has centered on multilateral environmental diplomacy, sustainable development governance and science & technology for economic and social development. His recent research and writings have concentrated on the role of the private business sector in sustainable development governance and corporate social responsibility.

== Career and background ==
Usui is a Professor Emeritus at University of Tsukuba, and a professor at the Graduate School of International Business & Cultural Studies, Shukutoku University. Formerly he taught at the Graduate School of Media & Governance at Keio University from 1991 to 1995, as well as at the Graduate School of Management & Public Policy Studies, University of Tsukuba from 1976 to 1991.

Earlier, he served as Director of Research, United Nations Industrial Development Organization (UNIDO) in Vienna from 1986 to 1989; Head of the Industrialization & Technology Program, OECD Development Center, Paris from 1972 to 1976; and Economic Affairs Officer with the Department of Economic & Social Affairs, United Nations, New York from 1960 to 1967. He was also a member of the UN Commission of Science & Technology for Development (UNCSTD) and its predecessor, UNACSTD from 1990 to 1998 as well as participating on the WHO Advisory Committee on Health Research from 1997 to 1999. Source

== Recent publications ==
- 'The Role of Private Business in International Environmental Governance', Working Paper IAS–CGP Project on International Environmental Governance, 2002
- 'The Local Agenda 21 Platform for Sustainable Development: an Evaluation of the Recent Experience in Japan and the UK' (with Brendan F.D. Barrett), Cross-Cultural Business and Cultural Studies 5 (1), 2001
- Theories and Applications of Multilateral Negotiation (Japanese translation of I. William Zartman's International Multilateral Negotiation, Jossey-Bass 1994), Keio University Press, 2000
- 'Multilateral Environmental Diplomacy: Science-Politics Interface, Industry-Politics Interface and Issue Linkages in the Emerging System of Multilateral Negotiations', Cross-Cultural Business and Cultural Studies 3 (1), 1999
