= Yokokawa Station =

Railway station in Annaka, Gunma Prefecture, Japan

Yokokawa Station 横川駅
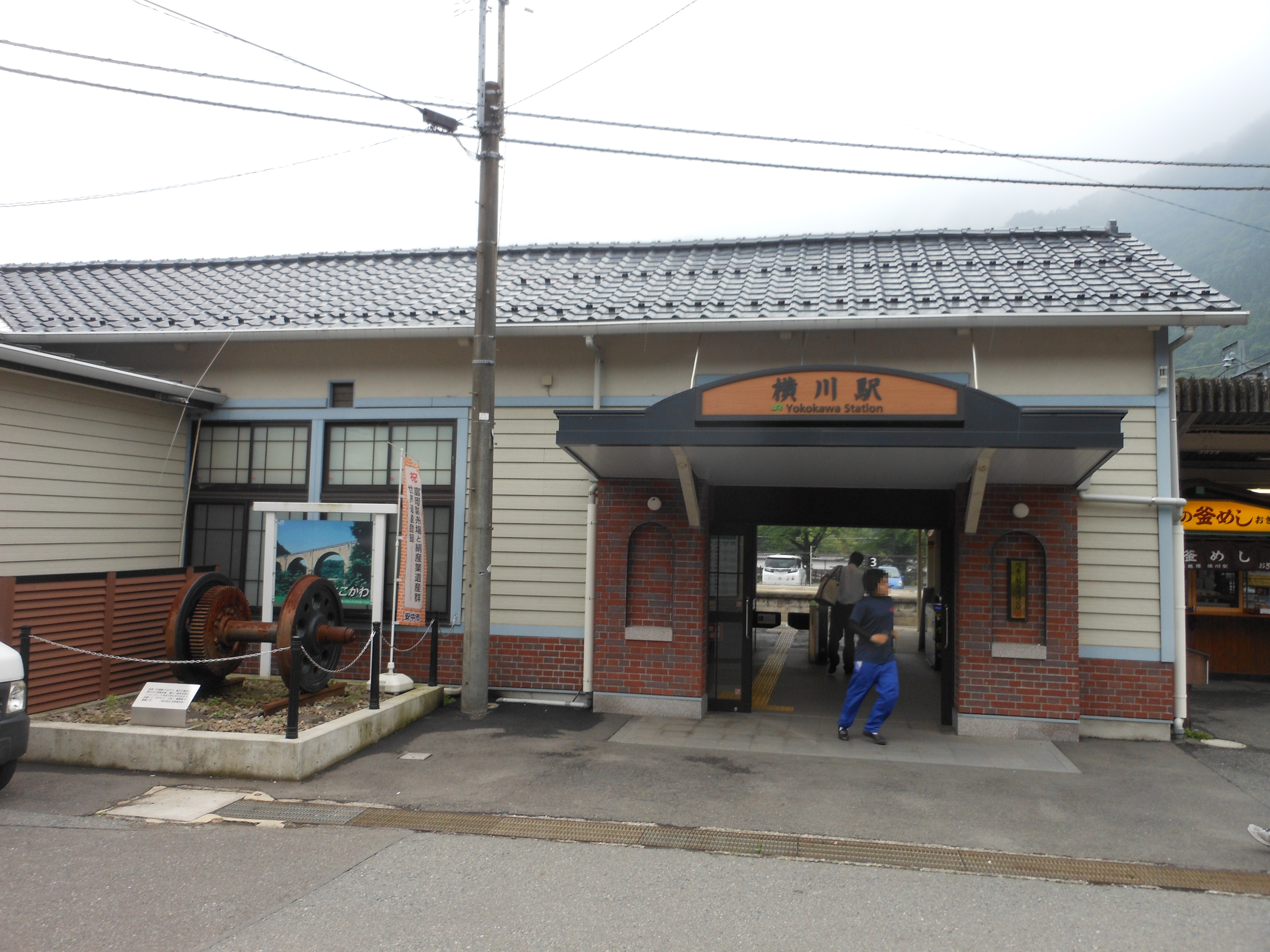
- Yokokawa Station in June 2015

General information
- Location: 398 Matsuida-machi Yokogawa, Annaka-shi, Gunma-ken 379-0301; Japan
- Coordinates: 36°20′10″N 138°44′13″E
- Operator: JR East
- Line: ■ Shin'etsu Line
- Distance: 29.7 km from Takasaki
- Platforms: 2 side platforms
- Tracks: 3

Other information
- Status: Staffed
- Website: Official website

History
- Opened: October 15, 1885

Passengers
- FY2019: 208

Services
Preceding station	JR East	Following station
Terminus	Shin'etsu Main Line Takasaki – Yokokawa	Nishi-Matsuida towards Takasaki
Former services
Preceding station	JR East	Following station
Karuizawa towards Niigata	Shin'etsu Main Line	Nishi-Matsuida towards Takasaki
Location
- Location within Gunma Prefecture Location within Japan

Yokokawa Station (横川駅, Yokokawa-eki) is a railway station in the city of Annaka, Gunma, Japan, operated by the East Japan Railway Company (JR East).

== Lines ==
Yokokawa Station is a terminal station for its segment of the Shin'etsu Main Line, and is located 29.7 kilometers from the starting point of the line at Takasaki.

== Station layout ==
The station has a two opposed side platforms connected to the station building by a footbridge. There is a third track in the middle for storing trains.

=== Platforms ===
1/3	■ Shinetsu Main Line	for Takasaki

== History ==
Yokokawa Station opened on October 15, 1885, as the terminus of the governmental railway between Takasaki and Yokokawa. The station became an intermediate station of the railway connecting Takasaki and Niigata (later named the Shinetsu Main Line) when the Usui Pass section of the railway, connecting Yokokawa and Karuizawa, opened on April 1, 1893.

The Usui Pass section of the railway closed on October 1, 1997. Yokokawa Station has been the terminus of the line since then.

The former Yokokawa locomotive depot for bank engines used on the Usui Pass was transformed into the Usui Pass Railway Heritage Park, which exhibits the bank engines (JNR Class EF63 electric locomotives) and other rolling stock.

JR BUS KANTO has been operating a route bus Usui Line which connects Karuizawa Station with this station as a bustitution of Shin'etsu Main Line's closed section since 1997.

== Passenger statistics ==
In fiscal 2019, the station was used by an average of 208 passengers daily (boarding passengers only).

== Bus routes ==
- JR BUS KANTO Usui Line
  - For Karuizawa Station
    - This bus route passes through Megane Bridge during autumn.

== Surrounding area ==
- National Route 18
- Yokogawa Post Office
