= List of dams in Gunma Prefecture =

The following is a list of dams in Gunma Prefecture, Japan.

== List ==
Name	Location	Opened	Height (metres)	Image
Aimata Dam		1959	67	
Akasan Choseichi Dam		1961	17.1	
Dodairagawa Dam		1992	70	
Fujiwara Dam		1957		
Funyūzawa Dam				
Hayakawa Dam		1940	26	
Hiraide Dam		1964	40	
Kajiyazawa Dam		1929	39.2	
Kazawa Dam		1927	18.2	
Kirizumi Dam		1975	59	
Kiryugawa Dam		1982	60.5	
Komori Dam		1958	33	
Kurosakaishi Dam		1981	24	
Kusaki Dam		1976	140	
Makabe Dam		1928	26.1	
Marunuma Dam		1931	32.1	
Mozawa Dam		1977	24.7	
Nakagi Dam		1959	41	
Nakanojo Dam		1960	42	
Naramata Dam		1990	158	
Narusawa Dam		1949	21	
Nozori Dam		1956	44	
Numata Dam (Note: Dam project cancelled in 1972.)				
Nyu Dam		1952	17.3	
Onita Dam		2001	54.4	
Oshio Dam		1965	31.9	
Otsu Dam		1931	19.6	
Sakamoto Dam			36.3	
Sannakawa Dam		1933	19.7	
Shimagawa Dam		1999	89.5	
Shimokubo Dam		1968	129	
Shinaki Dam		1965	43.5	
Shinsui Dam			20.5	
Shiozawa Dam		1995	38	
Shirasuna Dam			26.8	
Sonohara Dam		1965	76.5	
Sudagai Dam		1955	72	
Takatsudo Dam			29	
Takenuma Dam		1965	27.4	
Tambara Dam		1981		
Tatezawagawa Dam				
Terazawa Dam		1952	15.5	
Ueno Dam		2004	120	
Ushimagusa Dam		1955	27.8	
Yagisawa Dam		1967	131	
Yanba Dam		1 Apr 2020	131	

== See also ==
- Media related to Dams in Gunma prefecture at Wikimedia Commons
