= Sonohara =

Sonohara (written: 園原 or 薗原) may refer to:

- Takehiro Sonohara (園原 健弘, born 1962), Japanese racewalker
- Sonohara Dam (薗原 ダム), a dam in Gunma Prefecture, Japan
