= Kusaki Dam =

Kusaki Dam may refer to:

- Kusaki Dam (Hyōgo)
- Kusaki Dam (Gunma)
