= Komori Dam =

Komori Dam may refer to:

- Komori Dam (Gunma)
- Komori Dam (Mie)
