= Terazawa Dam =

Dam in Gunma Prefecture, Japan

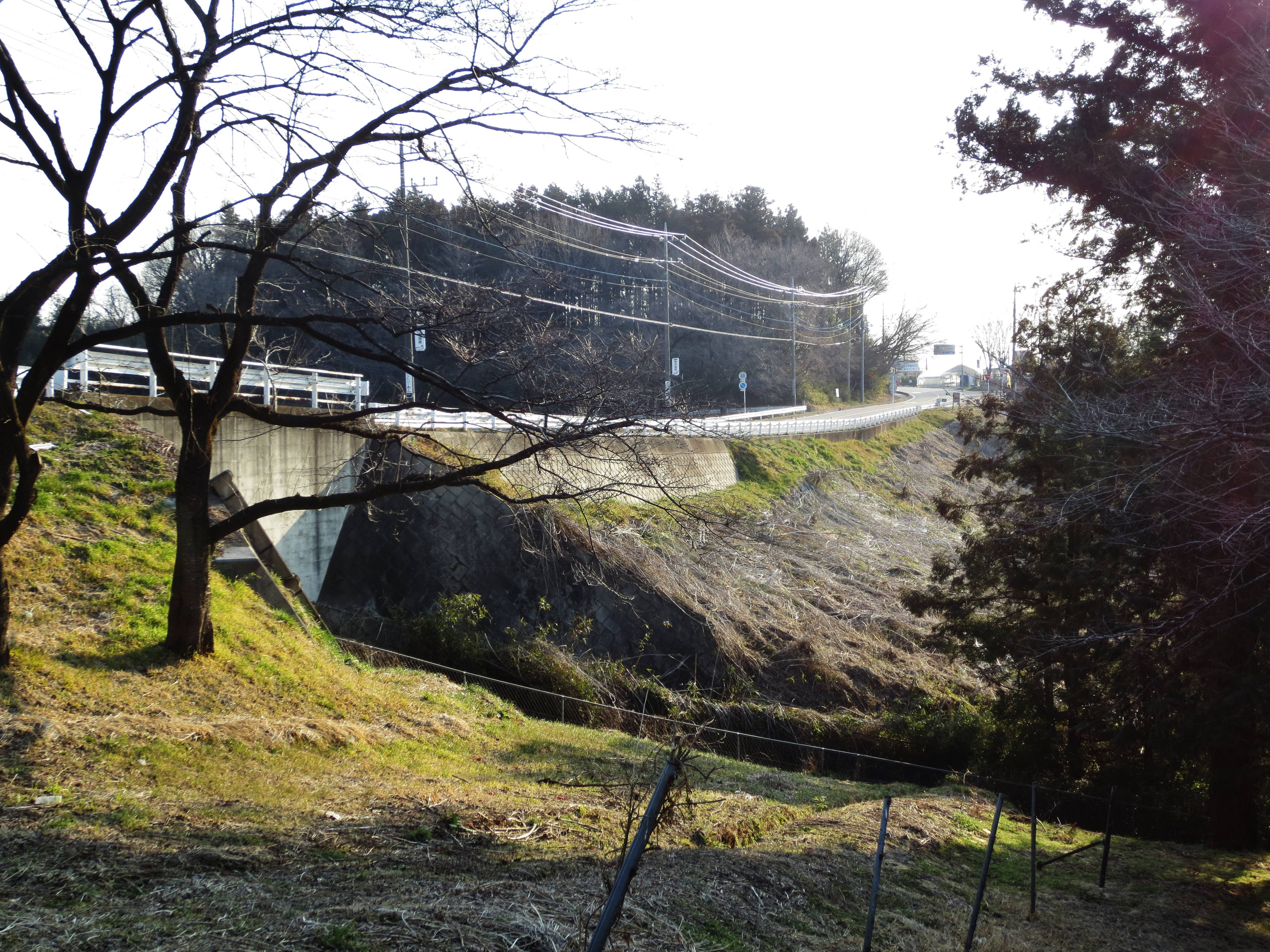

- Location within Japan
- Location: Gunma Prefecture, Japan
- Coordinates: 36°27′37″N 139°8′06″E
- Opening date: 1952

Dam and spillways
- Type of dam: Embankment
- Height: 15.5 m (51 ft)
- Length: 140 m (460 ft)

Reservoir
- Creates: Terazawa Lake
- Total capacity: 137,000 m^{3} (4,800,000 cu ft)
- Catchment area: 1.7 km^{2} (0.66 sq mi)
- Surface area: 3 hectares (7.4 acres)

Terazawa Dam is an earthfill dam located in Gunma Prefecture in Japan. The dam is used for irrigation. The catchment area of the dam is 1.7 km^{2}. The dam impounds about 3 ha of land when full and can store 137 thousand cubic meters of water. The construction of the dam was completed in 1952.
