= Ohsio Dam =

Dam in Gunma Prefecture, Japan

- Location within Japan
- Location: Gunma Prefecture, Japan
- Coordinates: 36°13′32″N 138°52′39″E
- Opening date: 1965

Dam and spillways
- Type of dam: Embankment
- Height: 31.9 m (105 ft)
- Length: 250.6 m (822 ft)

Reservoir
- Creates: Daien Lake
- Total capacity: 1,841,000 m^{3} (65,000,000 cu ft)
- Catchment area: 130.5 km^{2} (50.4 sq mi)
- Surface area: 15 hectares (37 acres)

Ohsio Dam is an earthfill dam located in Gunma Prefecture in Japan. The dam is used for flood control and irrigation. The catchment area of the dam is 130.5 km^{2}. The dam impounds about 15 ha of land when full and can store 1841 thousand cubic meters of water. The construction of the dam was completed in 1965.
