= Sakamoto Dam =

Sakamoto Dam may refer to:

- Sakamoto Dam (Kōchi)
- Sakamoto Dam (Gunma)
- Sakamoto Dam (Nara)
