= Kurosakaishi Dam =

Dam in Gunma Prefecture, Japan

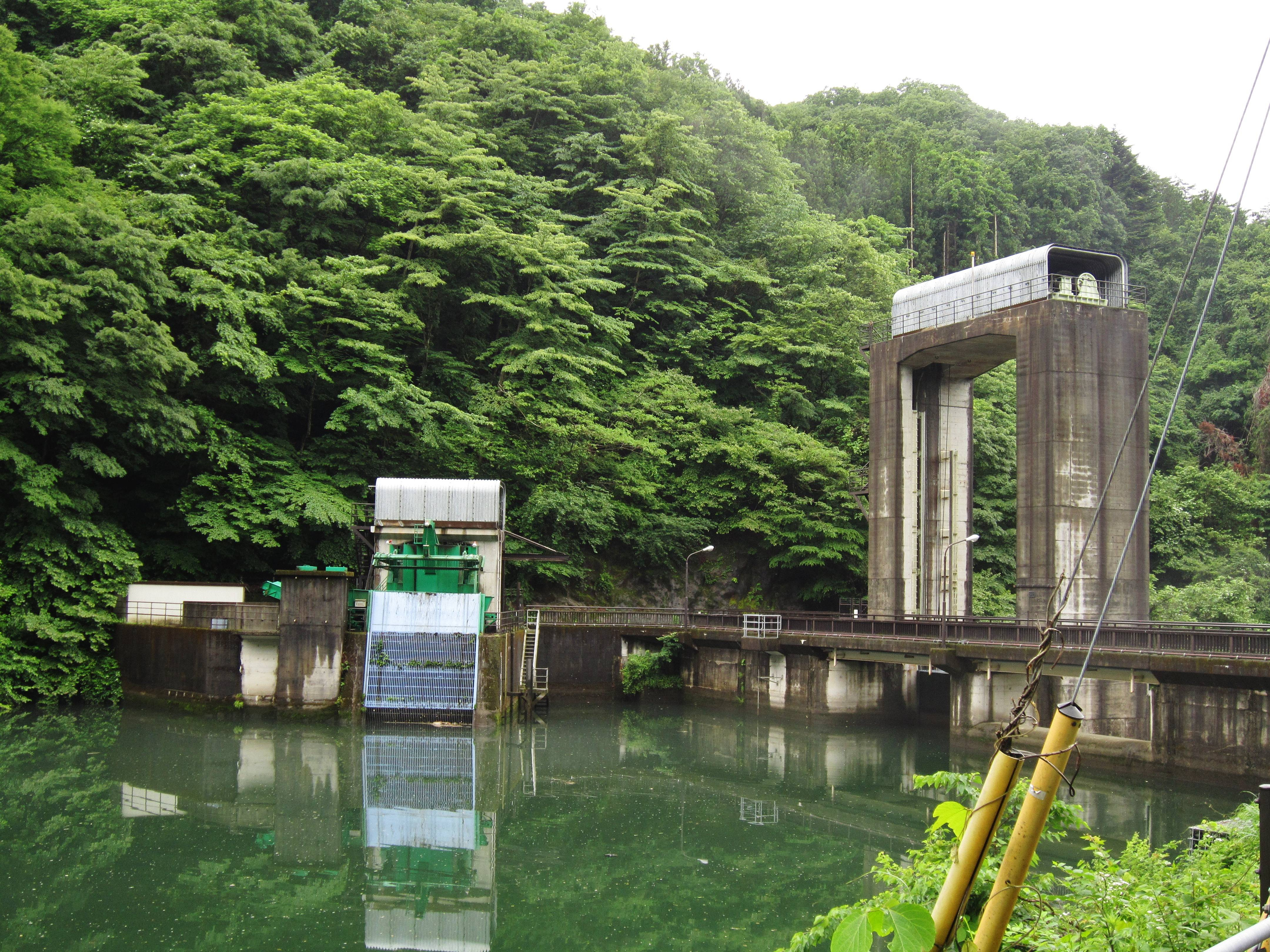

- Location within Japan
- Location: Gunma Prefecture, Japan
- Coordinates: 36°34′34″N 139°24′35″E
- Construction began: 1977
- Opening date: 1981

Dam and spillways
- Type of dam: Gravity
- Impounds: Kurosakaishi River
- Height: 24 m (79 ft)
- Length: 72 m (236 ft)

Reservoir
- Total capacity: 117,000 m^{3} (4,100,000 cu ft)
- Catchment area: 215.4 km^{2} (83.2 sq mi)
- Surface area: 2 hectares

Kurosakaishi Dam is a gravity dam located in Gunma Prefecture in Japan. The dam is used for power production. The catchment area of the dam is 215.4 km^{2}. The dam impounds about 2 ha of land when full and can store 117 thousand cubic meters of water. The construction of the dam was started on 1977 and completed in 1981.
