= Sannakawa Dam =

Dam in Gunma Prefecture, Japan

- Location within Japan
- Location: Gunma Prefecture, Japan
- Coordinates: 36°12′55″N 139°2′40″E
- Construction began: 1929
- Opening date: 1933

Dam and spillways
- Type of dam: Embankment
- Height: 19.7 m (65 ft)
- Length: 218.2 m (716 ft)

Reservoir
- Creates: Sanmei Lake
- Total capacity: 1,426,000 m^{3} (50,400,000 cu ft)
- Catchment area: 67.3 km^{2} (26.0 sq mi)
- Surface area: 13 hectares (32 acres)

Sannakawa Dam is an earthfill dam located in Gunma Prefecture in Japan. The dam is used for irrigation. The catchment area of the dam is 67.3 km^{2}. The dam impounds about 13 ha of land when full and can store 1426 thousand cubic meters of water. The construction of the dam was started on 1929 and completed in 1933.
