= Ushimagusa Dam =

Dam in Gunma Prefecture, Japan

- Location within Japan
- Location: Gunma Prefecture, Japan
- Coordinates: 36°12′48″N 139°2′06″E
- Construction began: 1951
- Opening date: 1955

Dam and spillways
- Type of dam: Embankment dam
- Height: 27.8 m (91 ft)
- Length: 257.5 m (845 ft)

Reservoir
- Creates: Ayukawa Lake
- Total capacity: 900,000 m^{3} (32,000,000 cu ft)
- Catchment area: 6.2 km^{2} (2.4 sq mi)
- Surface area: 10 hectares (25 acres)

Ushimagusa Dam is an earthfill dam located in Gunma Prefecture in Japan. The dam is used for irrigation. The catchment area of the dam is 6.2 km^{2}. The dam impounds about 10 ha of land when full and can store 900 thousand cubic meters of water. The construction of the dam was started on 1951 and completed in 1955.
