= Kusaki Dam (Gunma) =

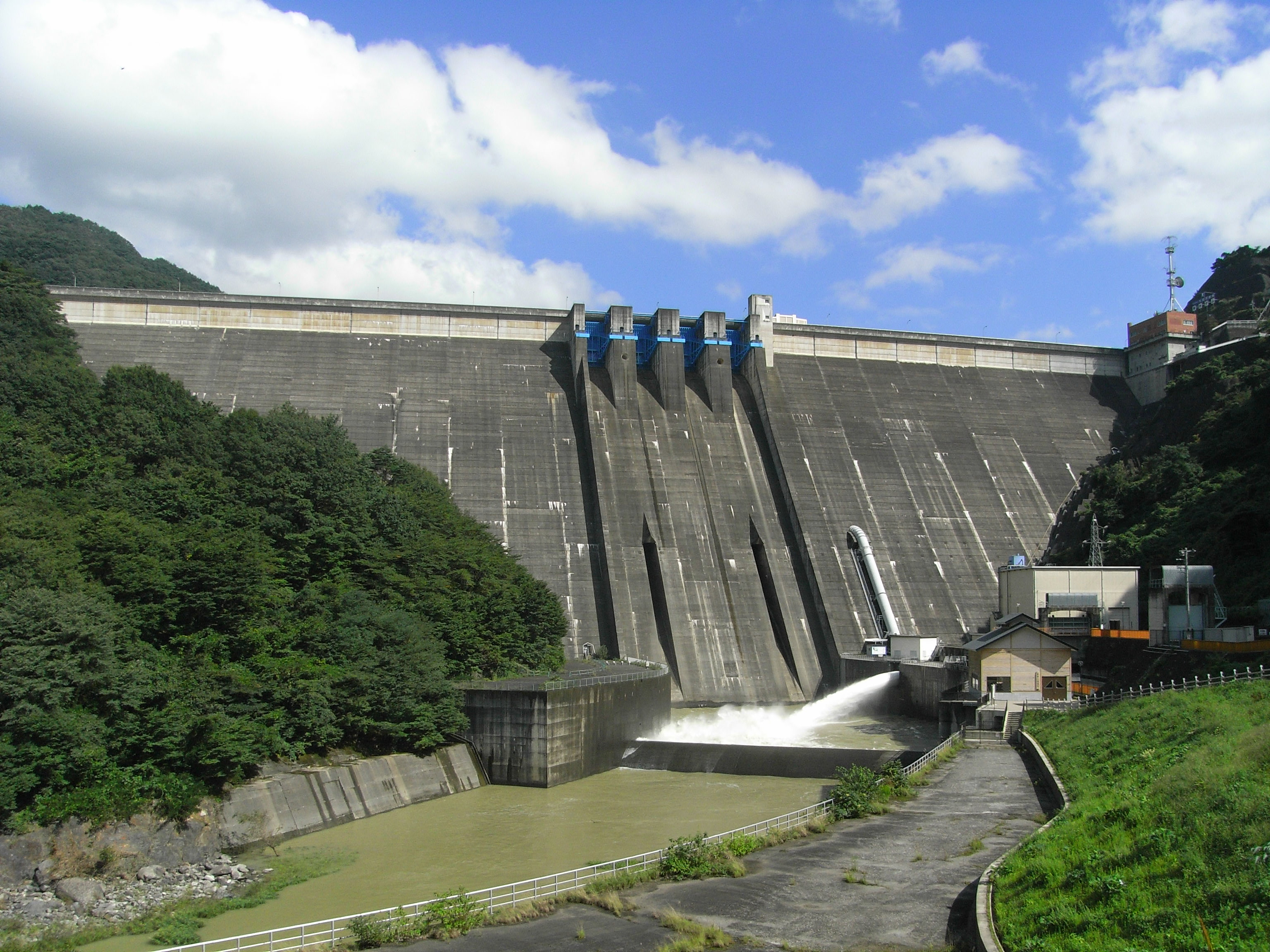
- Interactive map of Kusaki Dam
- Location: Gunma Prefecture, Japan
- Coordinates: 36°32′22″N 139°22′20″E
- Construction began: 1965
- Opening date: 1976

Dam and spillways
- Type of dam: Gravity
- Impounds: Watarase River
- Height: 140 m (460 ft)
- Length: 405 m (1,329 ft)

Reservoir
- Total capacity: 60,500,000 m^{3} (2.14×10^{9} cu ft)
- Catchment area: 254 km^{2} (98 sq mi)
- Surface area: 170 hectares

Kusaki Dam is a dam in the Gunma Prefecture of Japan.

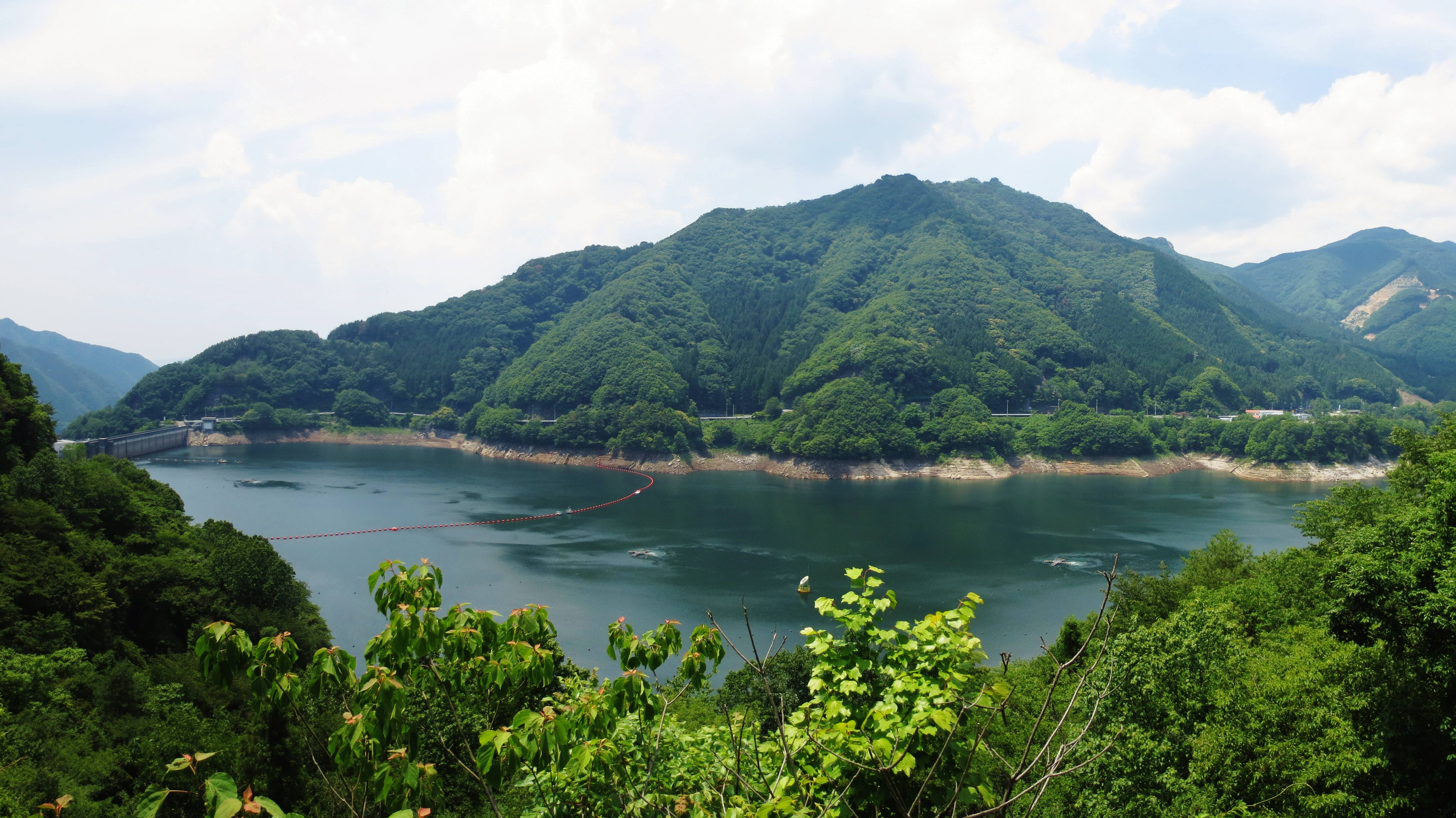
Kusaki Dam reservoir
