= Shirasuna Dam =

Dam in Gunma Prefecture, Japan

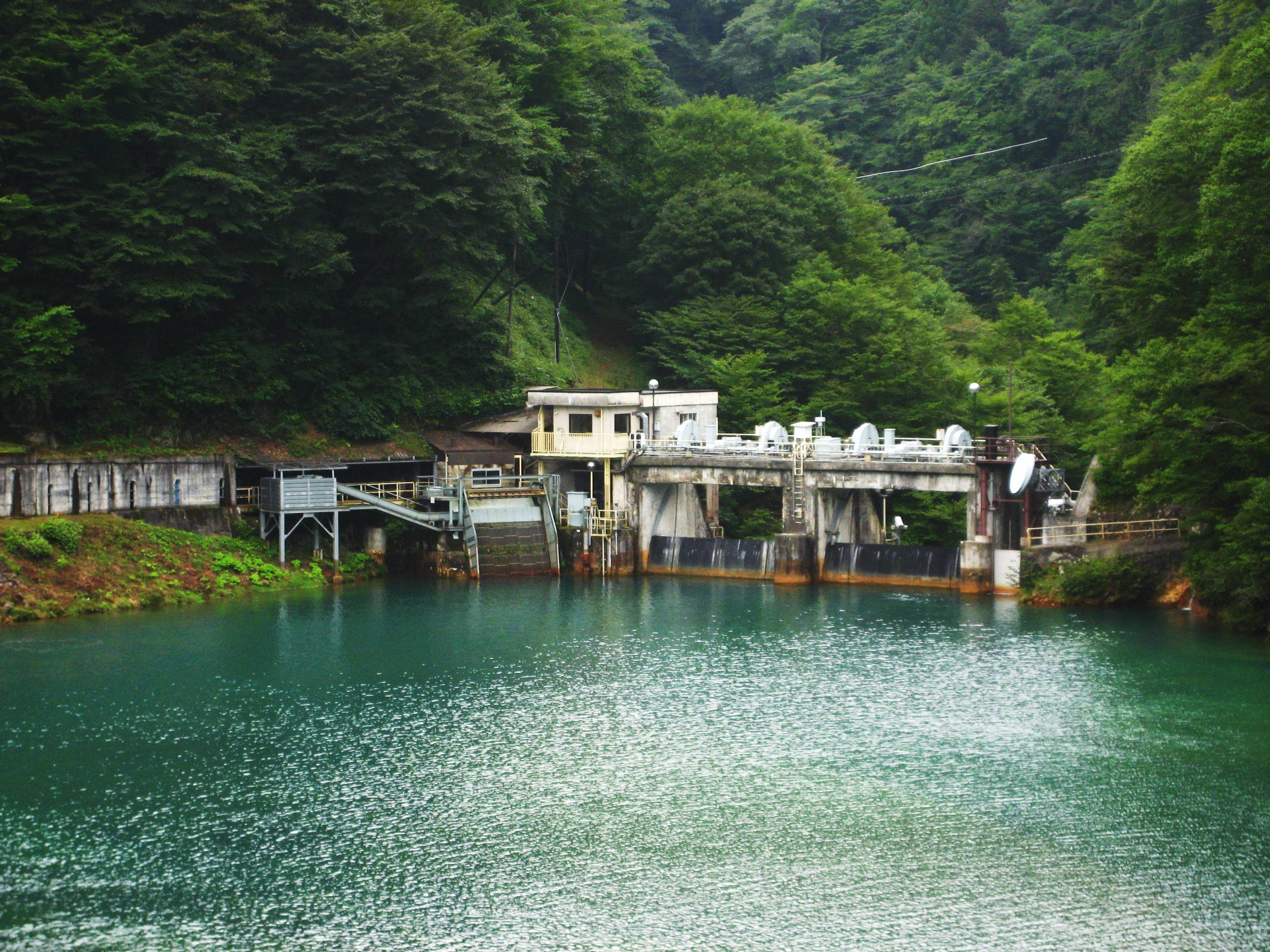
- Interactive map of Shirasuna Dam
- Location: Gunma Prefecture, Japan.
- Coordinates: 36.6503°N 138.6499°E
- Construction began: 1935
- Opening date: 1940

Dam and spillways
- Type of dam: Gravity
- Impounds: Shirasuna River
- Height: 26.8 m (88 ft)
- Length: 37.7 m (124 ft)

Reservoir
- Total capacity: 630,000 m^{3} (22,000,000 cu ft)
- Catchment area: 127.3 km^{2} (49.2 sq mi)
- Surface area: 7 hectares

Shirasuna Dam is a dam in Gunma Prefecture, Japan, completed in 1940.
