= Mozawa Dam =

Dam in Gunma Prefecture, Japan

- Location within Japan
- Location: Gunma Prefecture, Japan
- Coordinates: 36°28′14″N 138°59′25″E
- Construction began: 1971
- Opening date: 1977

Dam and spillways
- Type of dam: Embankment
- Impounds: Mozawa River
- Height: 24.7 m (81 ft)
- Length: 134.6 m (442 ft)

Reservoir
- Total capacity: 173,000 m^{3} (6,100,000 cu ft)
- Catchment area: 1.8 km^{2} (0.69 sq mi)
- Surface area: 3 hectares

Mozawa Dam is an earthfill dam located in Gunma Prefecture in Japan. The dam is used for flood control. The catchment area of the dam is 1.8 km^{2}. The dam impounds about 3 ha of land when full and can store 173 thousand cubic meters of water. The construction of the dam was started on 1971 and completed in 1977.
