= Kajiyazawa Dam =

Dam in Gunma Prefecture, Japan

- Location within Japan
- Interactive map of Kajiyazawa Dam
- Location: Gunma Prefecture, Japan
- Coordinates: 36°34′20″N 138°43′16″E
- Construction began: 1927
- Opening date: 1929

Dam and spillways
- Type of dam: Gravity
- Height: 39.2 m (129 ft)
- Length: 90.9 m (298 ft)

Reservoir
- Total capacity: 257,000 m^{3} (9,100,000 cu ft)
- Catchment area: 686.8 km^{2} (265.2 sq mi)
- Surface area: 3 hectares

Kajiyazawa Dam is a gravity dam located in Gunma Prefecture in Japan. The dam is used for power production. The catchment area of the dam is 686.8 km^{2}. The dam impounds about 3 ha of land when full and can store 257 thousand cubic meters of water. The construction of the dam was started on 1927 and completed in 1929.
