= Ohtsu Dam =

Dam in Gunma Prefecture, Japan

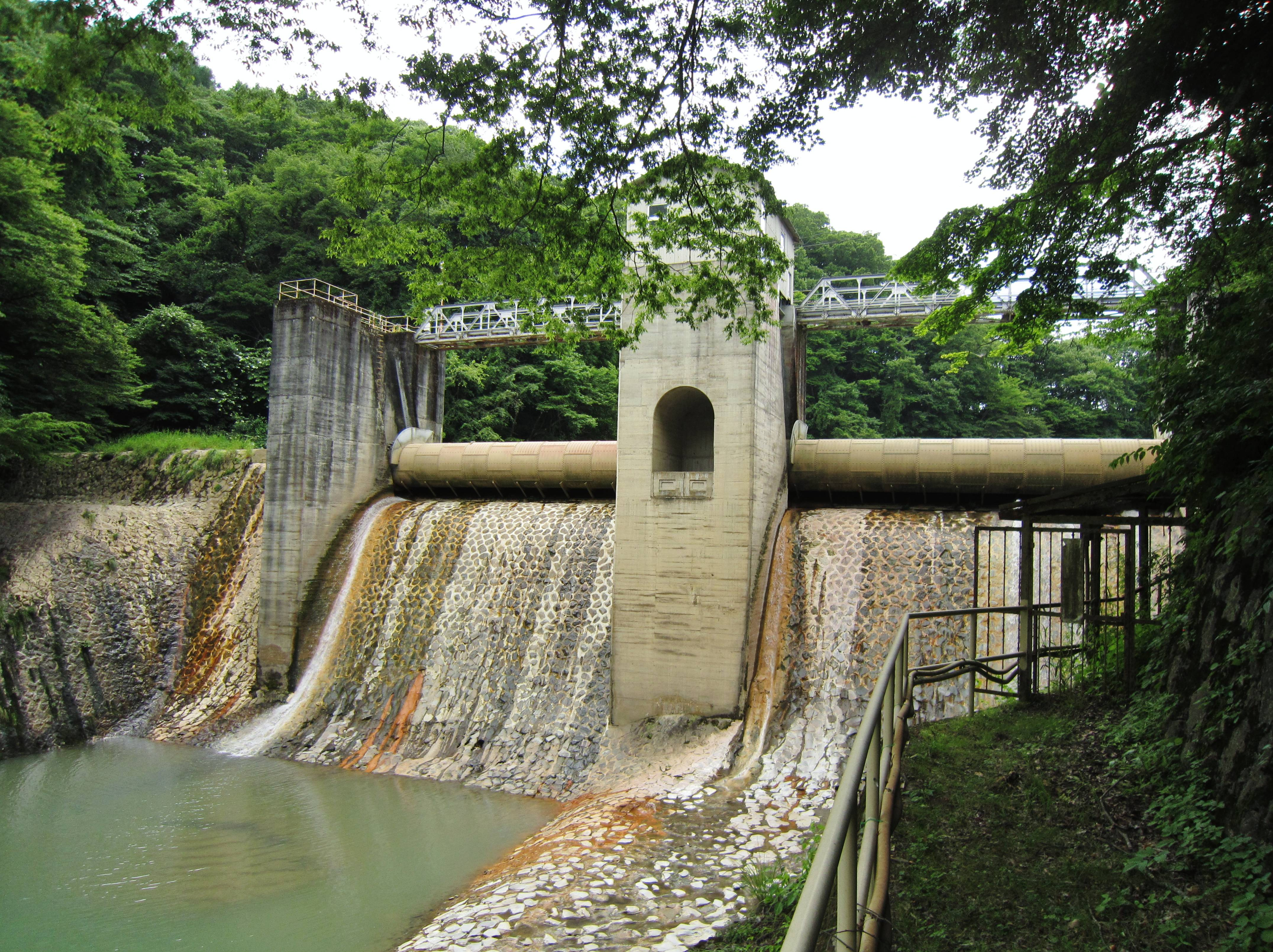

- Location within Japan
- Location: Gunma Prefecture, Japan
- Coordinates: 36°33′05″N 138°37′38″E
- Construction began: 1928
- Opening date: 1931

Dam and spillways
- Type of dam: Gravity
- Impounds: Agatsuma River
- Height: 19.6 m (64 ft)
- Length: 73.9 m (242 ft)

Reservoir
- Total capacity: 108,000 m^{3} (3,800,000 cu ft)
- Catchment area: 451 km^{2} (174 sq mi)
- Surface area: 4 hectares (9.9 acres)

Ohtsu Dam is a gravity dam located in Gunma Prefecture in Japan. The dam is used for power production. The catchment area of the dam is 451 km^{2}. The dam impounds about 4 ha of land when full and can store 108 thousand cubic meters of water. The construction of the dam was started on 1928 and completed in 1931.
