= Kirizumi Dam =

Dam in Gunma Prefecture, Japan

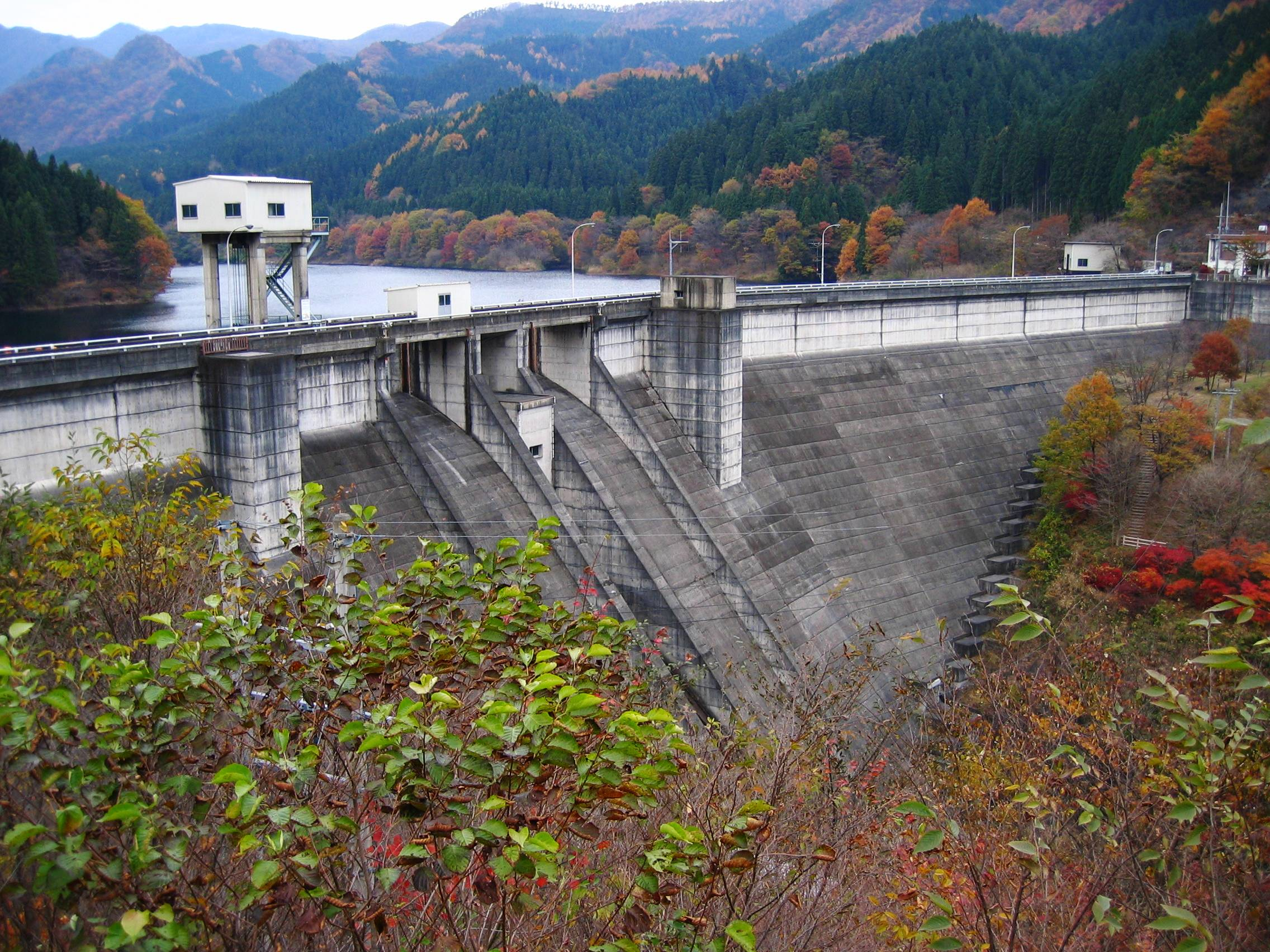

- Location within Japan
- Location: Gunma Prefecture, Japan
- Coordinates: 36°22′07″N 138°42′03″E
- Construction began: 1968
- Opening date: 1975

Dam and spillways
- Type of dam: Gravity
- Impounds: Kirizumi River
- Height: 59 m (194 ft)
- Length: 305 m (1,001 ft)

Reservoir
- Creates: Kirizumi Lake
- Total capacity: 2,500,000 m^{3} (88,000,000 cu ft)
- Catchment area: 20.4 km^{2} (7.9 sq mi)
- Surface area: 13 hectares

Kirizumi Dam is a gravity dam located in Gunma Prefecture in Japan. The dam is used for flood control. The catchment area of the dam is 20.4 km^{2}. The dam impounds about 13 ha of land when full and can store 2500 thousand cubic meters of water. The construction of the dam was started on 1968 and completed in 1975.
