= Takenuma Dam =

Dam in Gunma Prefecture, Japan

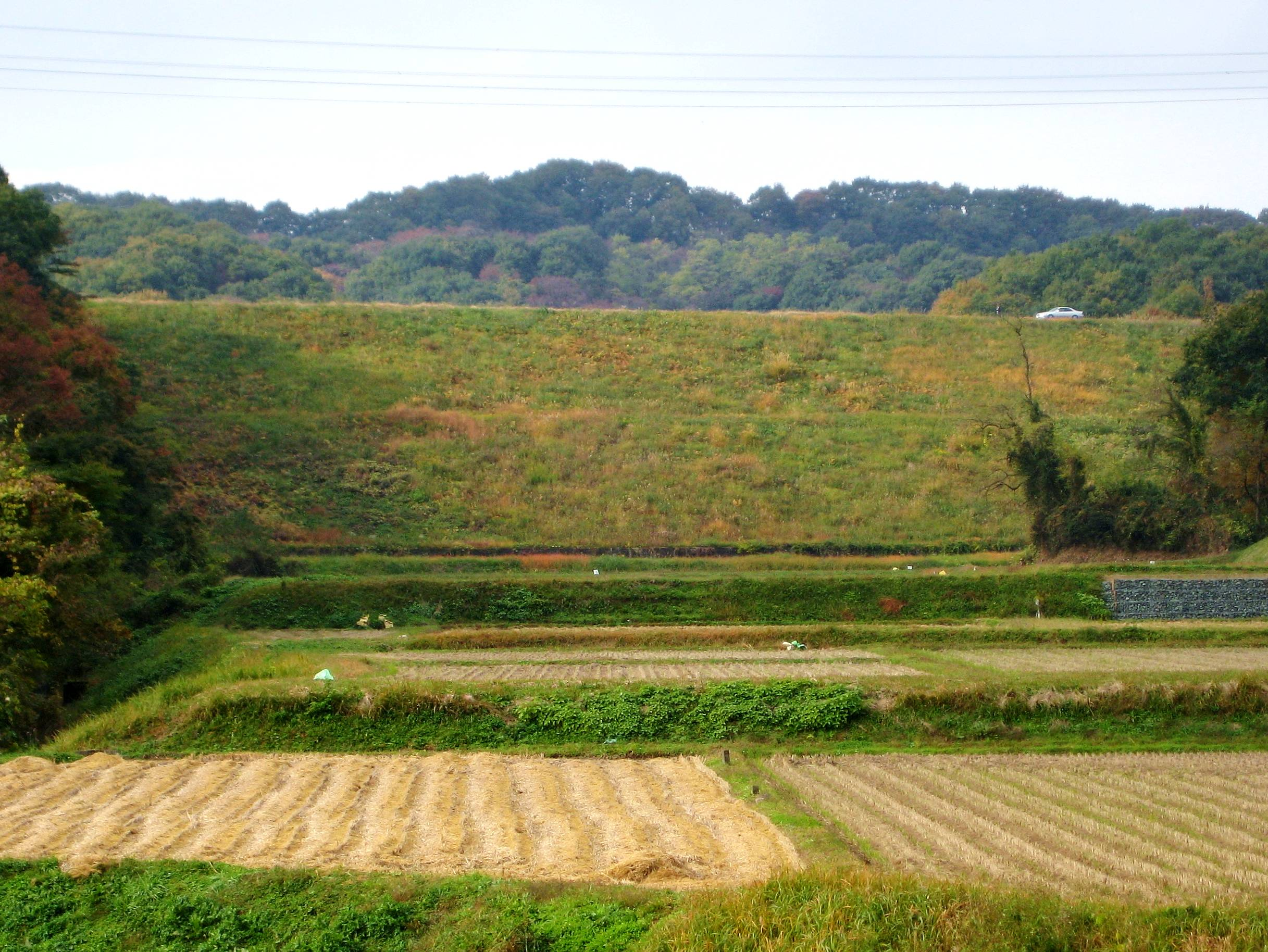

- Location within Japan
- Location: Gunma Prefecture, Japan
- Coordinates: 36°14′10″N 139°1′22″E
- Opening date: 1965

Dam and spillways
- Type of dam: Embankment
- Height: 27.4 m (90 ft)
- Length: 215 m (705 ft)

Reservoir
- Total capacity: 1,034,000 m^{3} (36,500,000 cu ft)
- Catchment area: 0.6 km^{2} (0.23 sq mi)
- Surface area: 13 hectares (32 acres)

Takenuma Dam is an earthfill dam located in Gunma Prefecture in Japan. The dam is used for irrigation. The catchment area of the dam is 0.6 km^{2}. The dam impounds about 13 ha of land when full and can store 1034 thousand cubic meters of water. The construction of the dam was completed in 1965.
