= Nyu Dam =

Dam in Gunma Prefecture, Japan

- Location within Japan
- Location: Gunma Prefecture, Japan
- Coordinates: 36°15′39″N 138°49′55″E
- Construction began: 1936
- Opening date: 1952

Dam and spillways
- Type of dam: Embankment
- Height: 17.3 m (57 ft)
- Length: 398.2 m (1,306 ft)

Reservoir
- Creates: Nyu Lake
- Total capacity: 1,447,000 m^{3} (51,100,000 cu ft)
- Catchment area: 14.6 km^{2} (5.6 sq mi)
- Surface area: 23 hectares (57 acres)

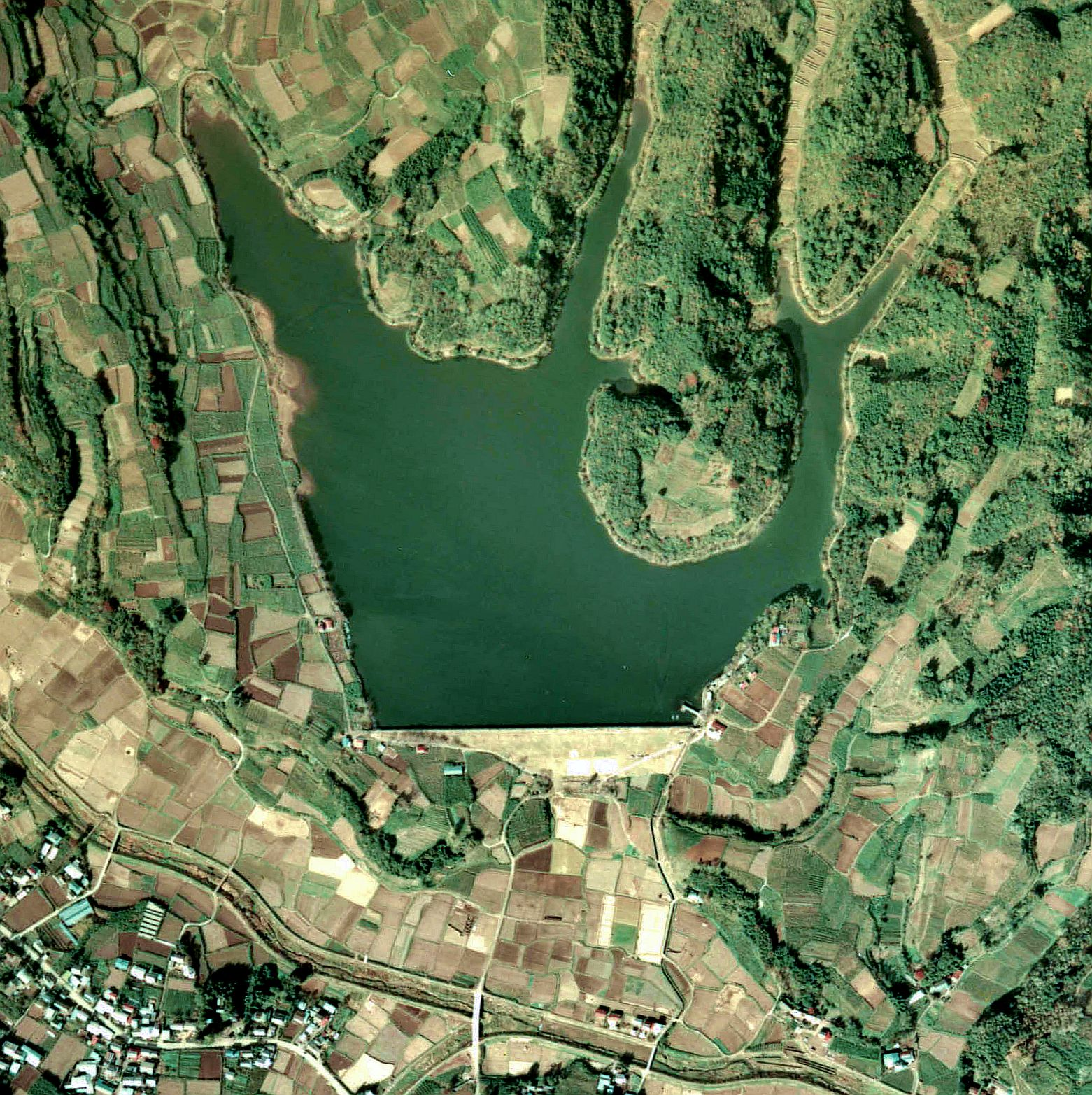
Aerial view of Nyū Dam

Nyu Dam is an earthfill dam located in Gunma Prefecture in Japan. The dam is used for irrigation. The catchment area of the dam is 14.6 km^{2}. The dam impounds about 23 ha of land when full and can store 1447 thousand cubic meters of water. The construction of the dam was started in 1936 and completed in 1952.
