= Akasan Choseichi Dam =

Dam in Gunma Prefecture, Japan

- Location within Japan
- Location: Gunma Prefecture, Japan
- Coordinates: 36°44′59″N 138°53′16″E
- Construction began: 1958
- Opening date: 1961

Dam and spillways
- Type of dam: Gravity
- Impounds: Akadan River
- Height: 17.1 m (56 ft)
- Length: 27.2 m (89 ft)

Reservoir
- Total capacity: 26,000 m^{3} (920,000 cu ft)
- Catchment area: 55.6 km^{2} (21.5 sq mi)
- Surface area: 2 hectares

Akasan Choseichi Dam is a gravity dam located in Gunma Prefecture in Japan. The dam is used for power production. The catchment area of the dam is 55.6 km^{2}. The dam impounds about 2 ha of land when full and can store 26 thousand cubic meters of water. The construction of the dam was started on 1958 and completed in 1961.
