= Shimagawa Dam =

Dam in Gunma Prefecture, Japan

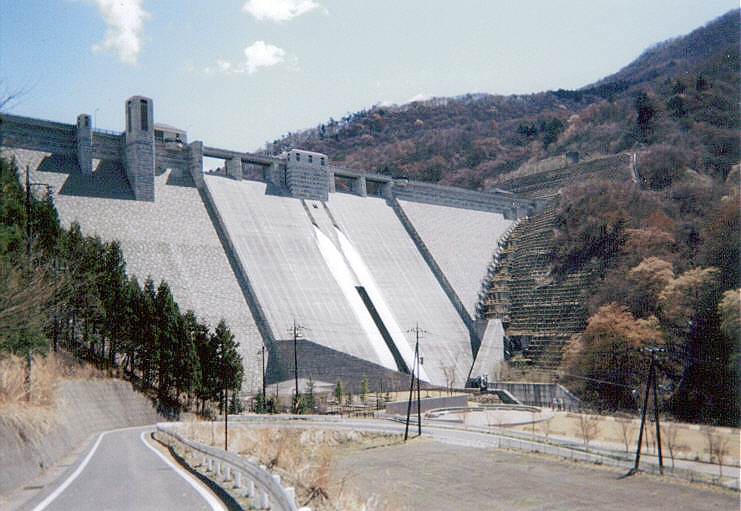
- Interactive map of Shimagawa Dam
- Location: Gunma Prefecture, Japan.
- Coordinates: 36°41′47″N 138°46′53″E
- Construction began: 1980
- Opening date: 1999

Dam and spillways
- Type of dam: Gravity
- Impounds: Shima River
- Height: 89.5 m (294 ft)
- Length: 330 m (1,080 ft)

Reservoir
- Total capacity: 9,200,000 m^{3} (320,000,000 cu ft)
- Catchment area: 28.4 km^{2} (11.0 sq mi)

Shimagawa Dam is a dam in the Gunma Prefecture of Japan.
