= Shinaki Dam =

Dam in Gunma Prefecture, Japan

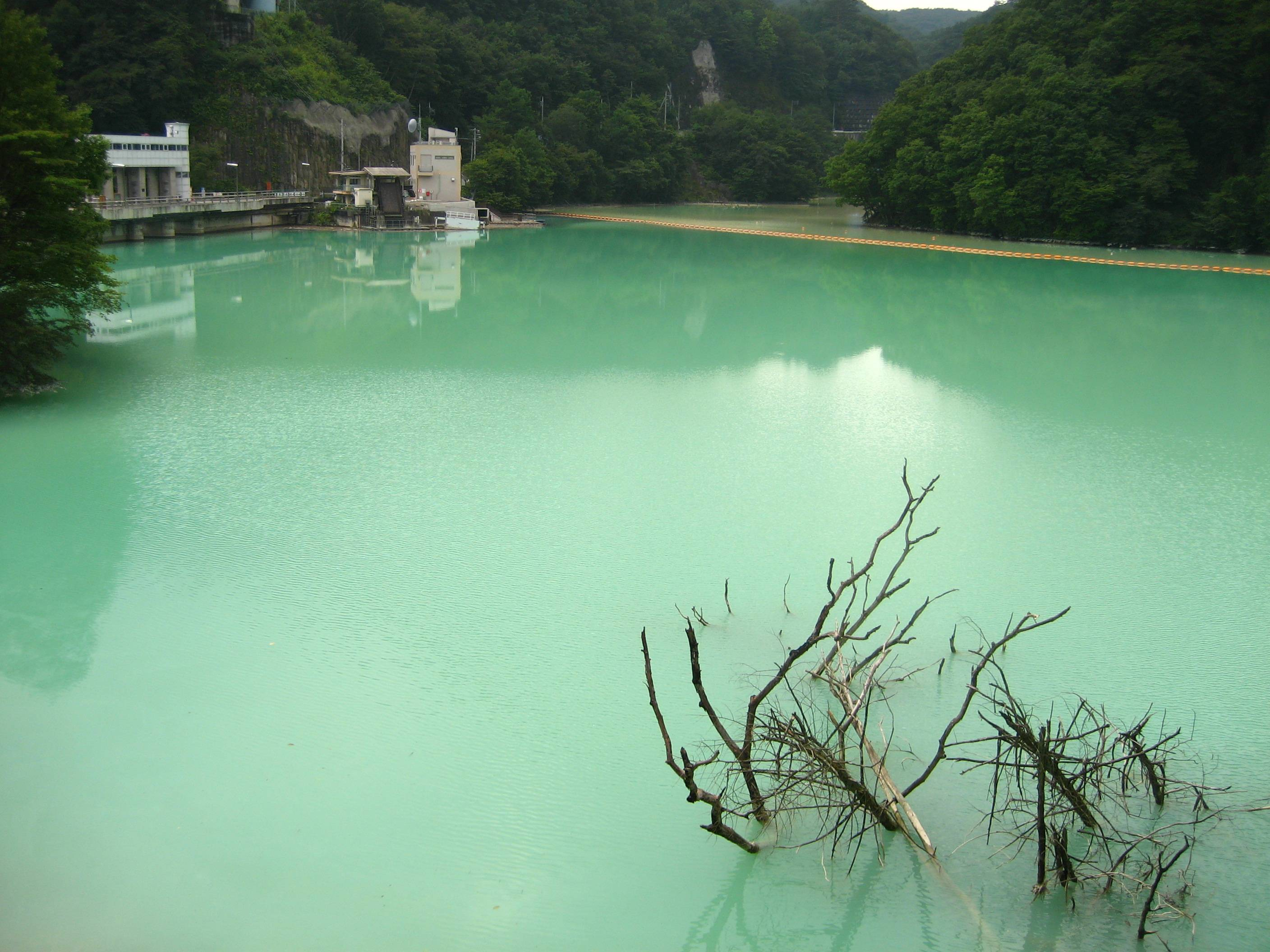
- Interactive map of Shinaki Dam
- Location: Kuni, Gunma Prefecture, Japan.
- Coordinates: 36°37′41″N 138°38′04″E
- Construction began: 1961
- Opening date: 1965

Dam and spillways
- Type of dam: Gravity
- Impounds: Yasawa River
- Height: 43.5 m (143 ft)
- Length: 106 m (348 ft)

Reservoir
- Total capacity: 1,273,000 m^{3} (45,000,000 cu ft)
- Catchment area: 30.9 km^{2} (11.9 sq mi)
- Surface area: 12 hectares

Shinaki Dam (品木ダム) is a dam in the Gunma Prefecture of Japan.

Shinaki dam was constructed to neutralize strong acid water that flowed from Kusatsu Onsen. Calcium carbonate is used for neutralizing.
