= Nakanojo Dam =

Dam in Gunma Prefecture, Japan

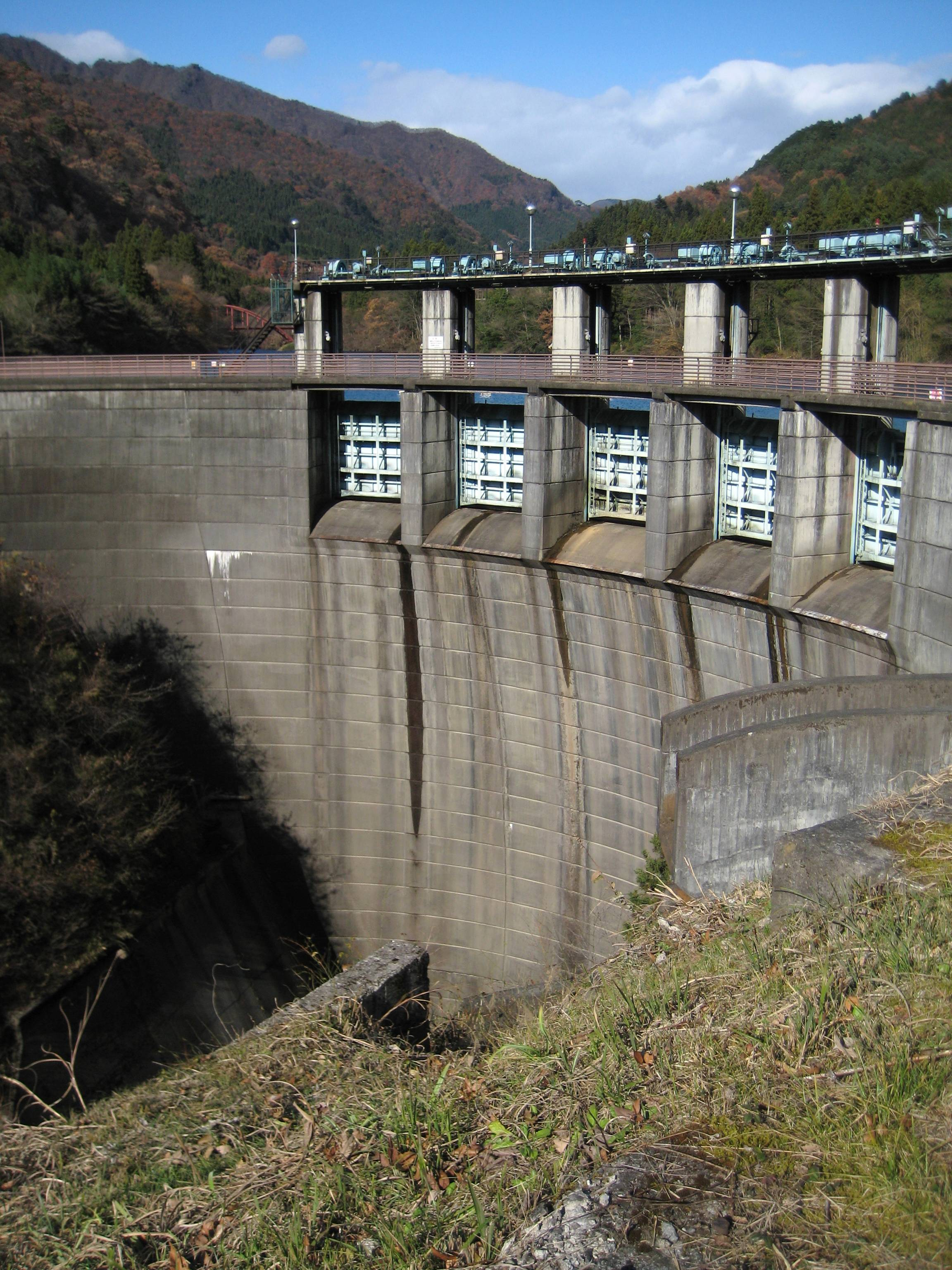

- Location within Japan
- Location: Gunma Prefecture, Japan
- Coordinates: 36°37′18″N 138°47′44″E
- Construction began: 1957
- Opening date: 1960

Dam and spillways
- Type of dam: Arch-Gravity
- Impounds: Shima River
- Height: 42 m (138 ft)
- Length: 118.2 m (388 ft)

Reservoir
- Total capacity: 1,180,000 m^{3} (42,000,000 cu ft)
- Catchment area: 143.6 km^{2} (55.4 sq mi)
- Surface area: 11 hectares

Nakanojo Dam is an arch dam located in Gunma Prefecture in Japan. The dam is used for irrigation and power production. The catchment area of the dam is 143.6 km^{2}. The dam impounds about 11 ha of land when full and can store 1180 thousand cubic meters of water. The construction of the dam was started on 1957 and completed in 1960.
