= Kusaki Dam (Hyōgo) =

Dam in Hyogo Prefecture, Japan

- Location within Japan
- Official name: 草木ダム
- Location: Hyogo Prefecture, Japan
- Coordinates: 35°11′11″N 134°39′42″E
- Opening date: 1913

Dam and spillways
- Height: 24.8 m (81 ft)
- Length: 86.4 m (283 ft)

Reservoir
- Total capacity: 248 thousand cubic meters
- Catchment area: 13.4 sq. km
- Surface area: 7 hectares

Kusaki Dam (Japanese: 草木ダム) is a gravity dam located in Hyogo Prefecture in Japan. The dam is used for power production. The catchment area of the dam is 13.4 km^{2}. The dam impounds about 7 ha of land when full and can store 248 thousand cubic meters of water. The construction of the dam was completed in 1913.

== See also ==
- List of dams in Japan
