= Kazawa Dam =

Dam in Gunma Prefecture, Japan

- Location within Japan
- Location: Gunma Prefecture, Japan
- Coordinates: 36°29′11″N 138°28′16″E
- Construction began: 1926
- Opening date: 1927

Dam and spillways
- Type of dam: Embankment
- Height: 18.2 m (60 ft)
- Length: 981.8 m (3,221 ft)

Reservoir
- Creates: Tashiro Lake
- Total capacity: 5,634,000 m^{3} (199,000,000 cu ft)
- Catchment area: 72.5 km^{2} (28.0 sq mi)
- Surface area: 78 hectares

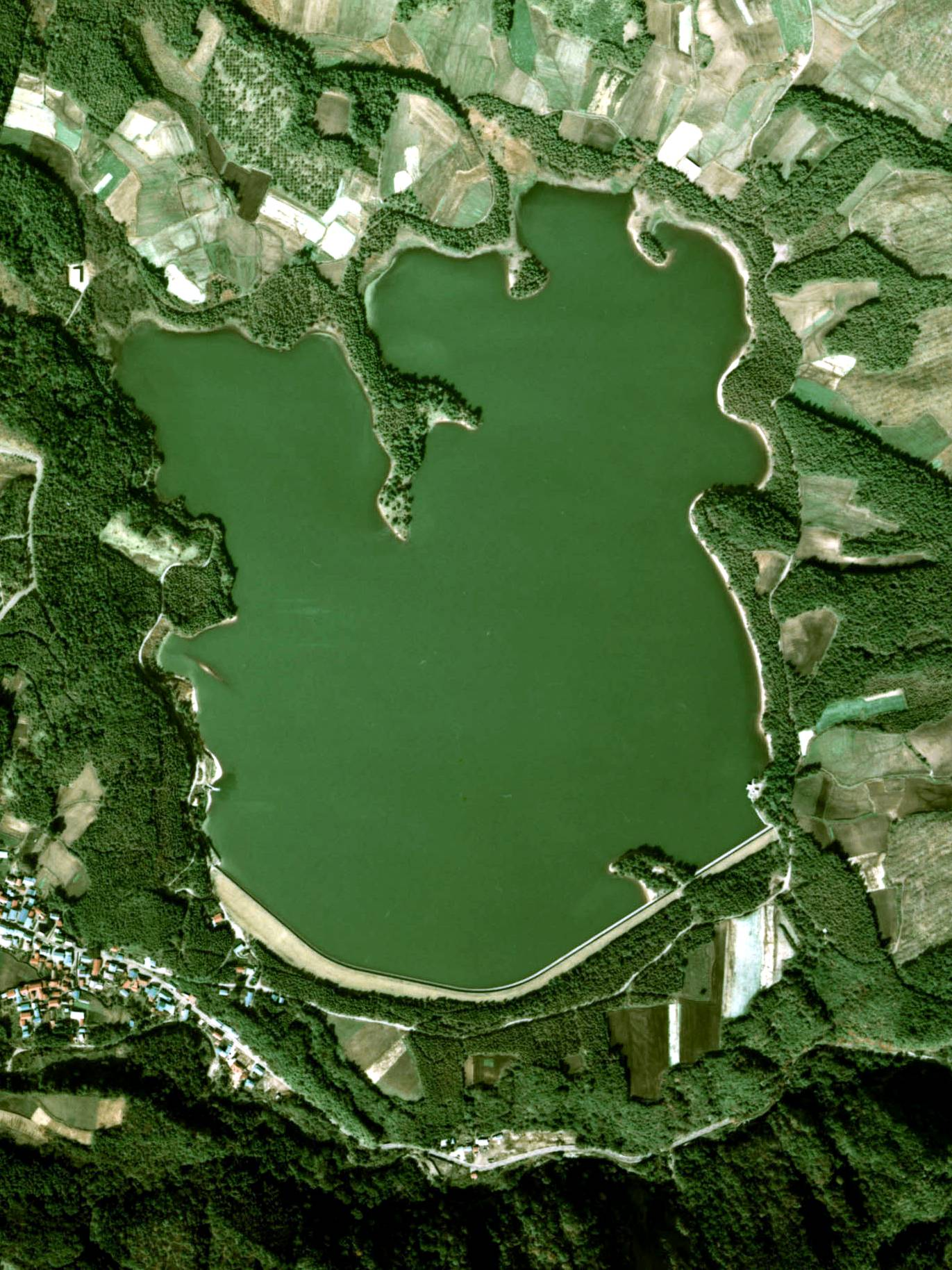
A survey picture of the dam

Kazawa Dam is an earthfill dam located in Gunma Prefecture in Japan. The dam is used for power production. The catchment area of the dam is 72.5 km^{2}. The dam impounds about 78 ha of land when full and can store 5634 thousand cubic meters of water. The construction of the dam was started on 1926 and completed in 1927.
