= Kiryugawa Dam =

Dam in Gunma Prefecture, Japan

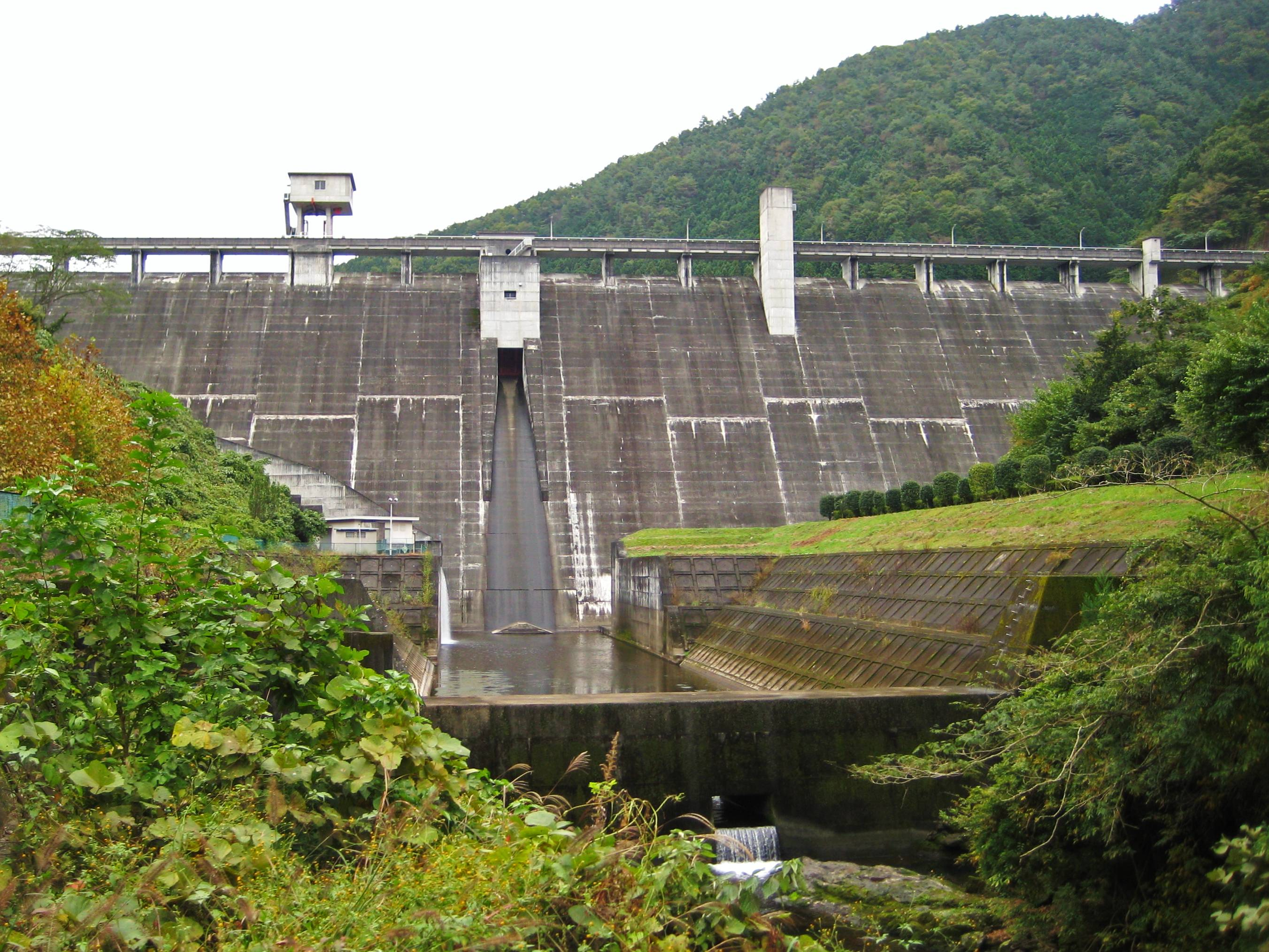

- Location within Japan
- Location: Gunma Prefecture, Japan
- Coordinates: 36°28′22″N 139°24′28″E
- Construction began: 1972
- Opening date: 1982

Dam and spillways
- Type of dam: Gravity
- Impounds: Kiryu River
- Height: 60.5 m (198 ft)
- Length: 264 m (866 ft)

Reservoir
- Total capacity: 12,200,000 m^{3} (430,000,000 cu ft)
- Catchment area: 42 km^{2} (16 sq mi)
- Surface area: 62 hectares

Kiryugawa Dam is a gravity dam located in Gunma Prefecture in Japan. The dam is used for flood control, water supply and power production. The catchment area of the dam is 42 km^{2}. The dam impounds about 62 ha of land when full and can store 12200 thousand cubic meters of water. The construction of the dam was started on 1972 and completed in 1982.
