= Makabe Dam =

Dam in Gunma Prefecture, Japan

- Location within Japan
- Location: Gunma Prefecture, Japan
- Coordinates: 36°29′08″N 139°2′37″E
- Construction began: 1922
- Opening date: 1928

Dam and spillways
- Type of dam: Gravity
- Height: 26.1 m (86 ft)
- Length: 535.6 m (1,757 ft)

Reservoir
- Total capacity: 1,143,000 m^{3} (40,400,000 cu ft)
- Catchment area: 1,737 km^{2} (671 sq mi)
- Surface area: 13 hectares

Makabe Dam is a gravity dam located in Gunma Prefecture in Japan. The dam is used for power production. The catchment area of the dam is 1737 km^{2}. The dam impounds about 13 hectares of land when full and can store 1143 thousand cubic meters of water. The construction of the dam was started in 1922 and completed in 1928.
