= Takatsudo Dam =

Dam in Gunma Prefecture, Japan

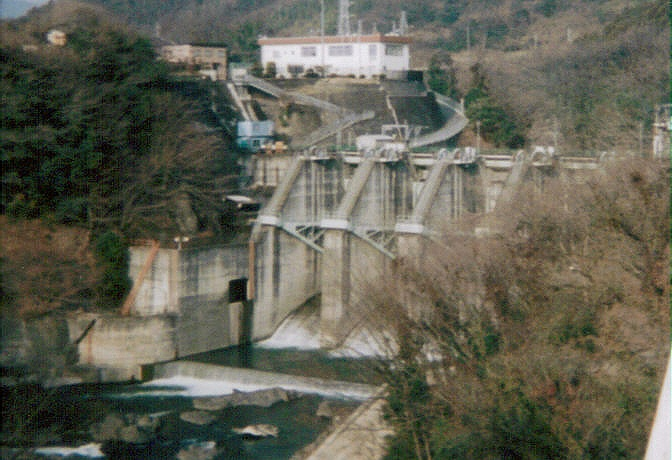
- Interactive map of Takatsudo Dam
- Location: Midori, Gunma Prefecture, Japan.
- Construction began: 1970
- Opening date: 1973

Dam and spillways
- Type of dam: Gravity
- Impounds: Watarase River
- Height: 29 m (95 ft)
- Length: 92 m (302 ft)

Reservoir
- Total capacity: 808,000 m^{3} (28,500,000 cu ft)
- Catchment area: 472 km^{2} (182 sq mi)
- Surface area: 11 hectares

Takatsudo Dam (高津戸ダム) is a dam in Midori, in the Gunma Prefecture of Japan, completed in 1973.
