= Hiraide Dam =

Dam in Gunma Prefecture, Japan

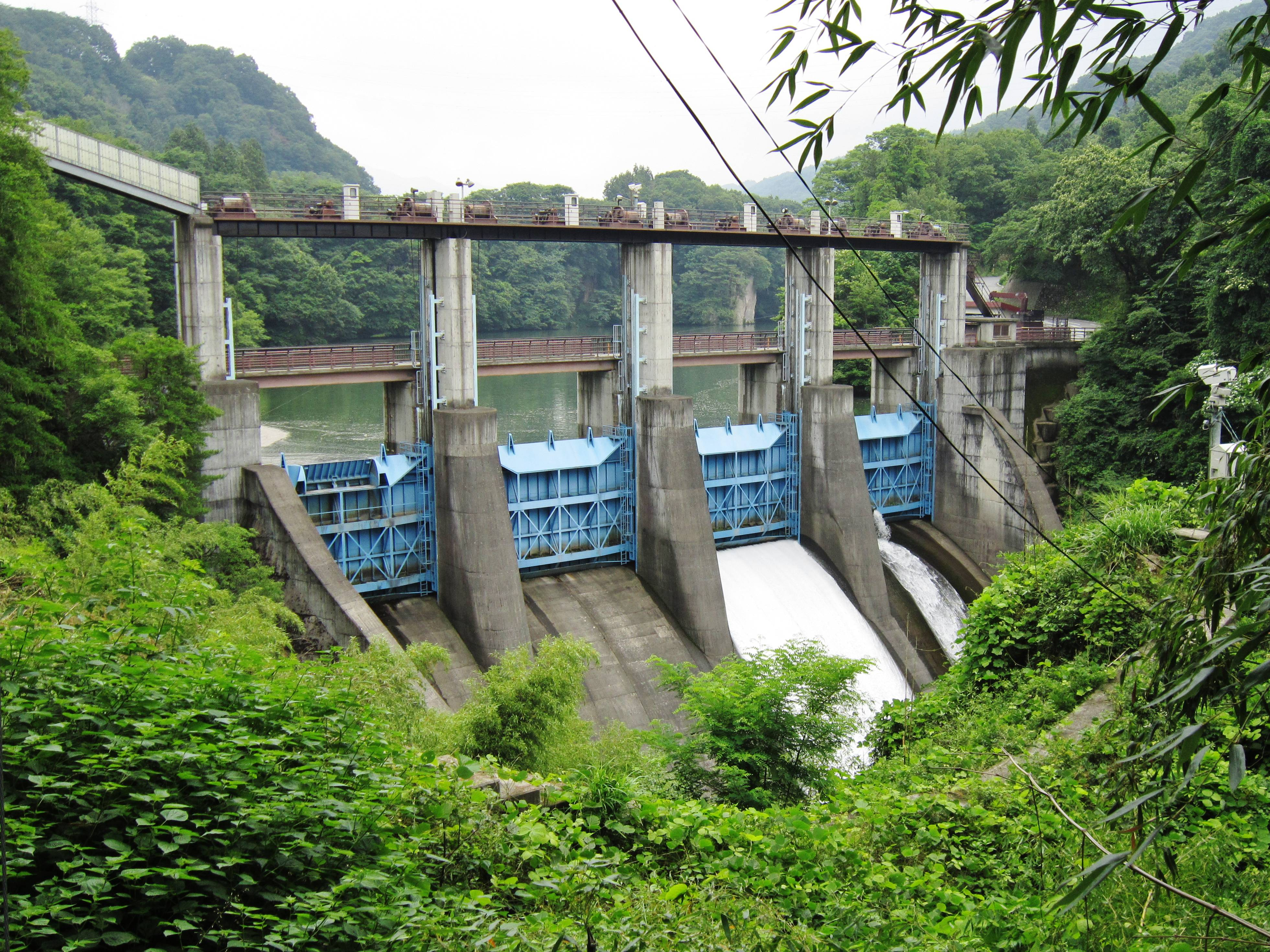

- Location within Japan
- Location: Gunma Prefecture, Japan
- Coordinates: 36°39′32″N 139°7′01″E
- Construction began: 1960
- Opening date: 1964

Dam and spillways
- Type of dam: Gravity
- Impounds: Katashina River
- Height: 40 m (130 ft)
- Length: 87 m (285 ft)

Reservoir
- Total capacity: 1,400,000 m^{3} (49,000,000 cu ft)1
- Catchment area: 635.3 km^{2} (245.3 sq mi)
- Surface area: 16 hectares

Hiraide Dam is a gravity dam located in Gunma Prefecture in Japan. The dam is used for power production. The catchment area of the dam is 635.3 km^{2}. The dam impounds about 16 ha of land when full and can store 1400 thousand cubic meters of water. The construction of the dam was started on 1960 and completed in 1964.
