= Dodairagawa Dam =

Dam in Gunma Prefecture, Japan

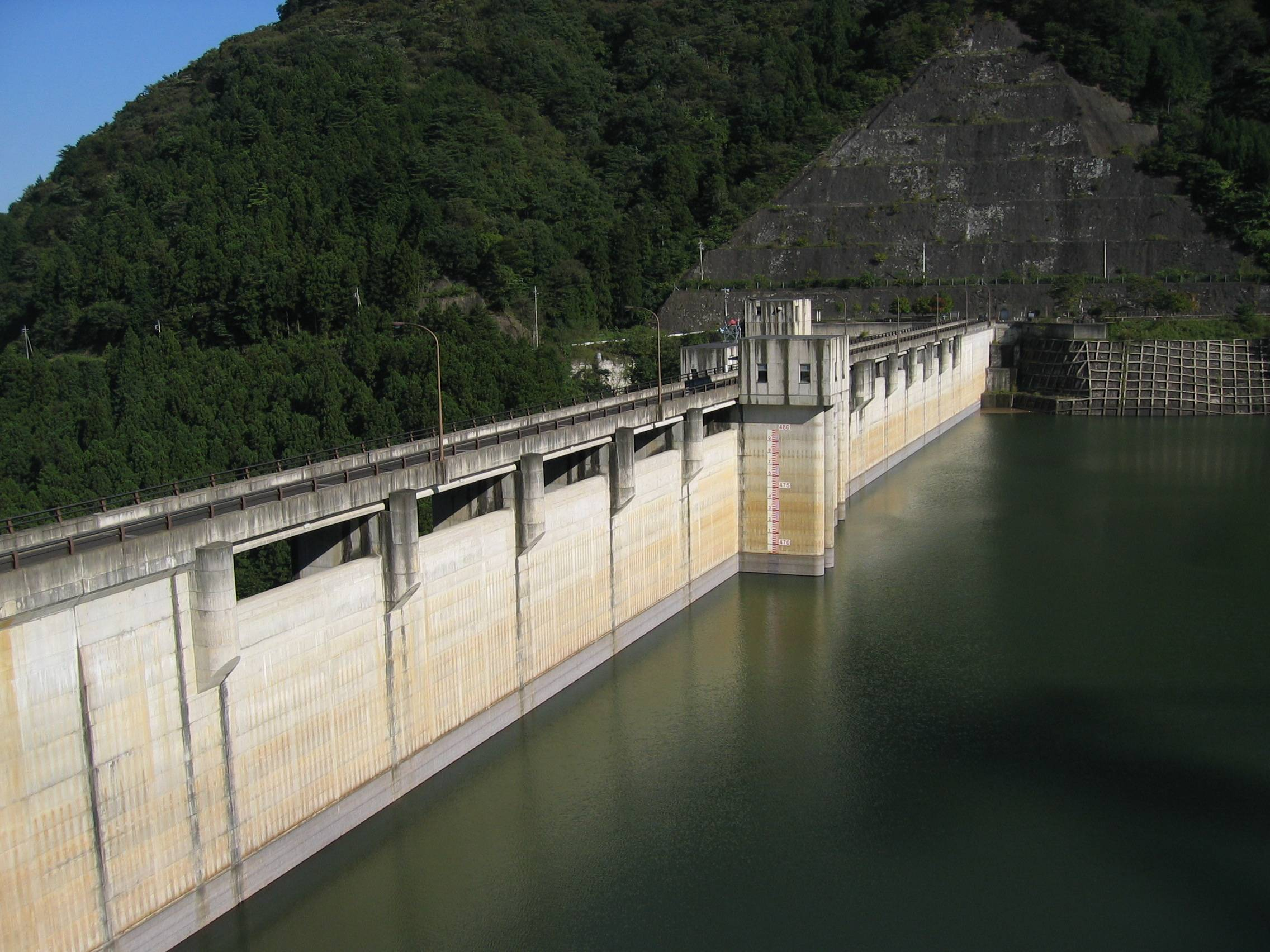

- Location within Japan
- Location: Gunma Prefecture, Japan
- Coordinates: 36°14′08″N 138°40′42″E
- Construction began: 1978
- Opening date: 1992

Dam and spillways
- Type of dam: Gravity
- Impounds: Ichinokaya River
- Height: 70 m (230 ft)
- Length: 300 m (980 ft)

Reservoir
- Creates: Arafune Lake
- Total capacity: 5,100,000 m^{3} (180,000,000 cu ft)
- Catchment area: 27.6 km^{2} (10.7 sq mi)
- Surface area: 22 hectares

Dodairagawa Dam is a gravity dam located in Gunma Prefecture in Japan. The dam is used for flood control and water supply. The catchment area of the dam is 27.6 km^{2}. The dam impounds about 22 ha of land when full and can store 5100 thousand cubic meters of water. The construction of the dam was started on 1978 and completed in 1992.
