= Hayakawa Dam =

Dam in Gunma Prefecture, Japan

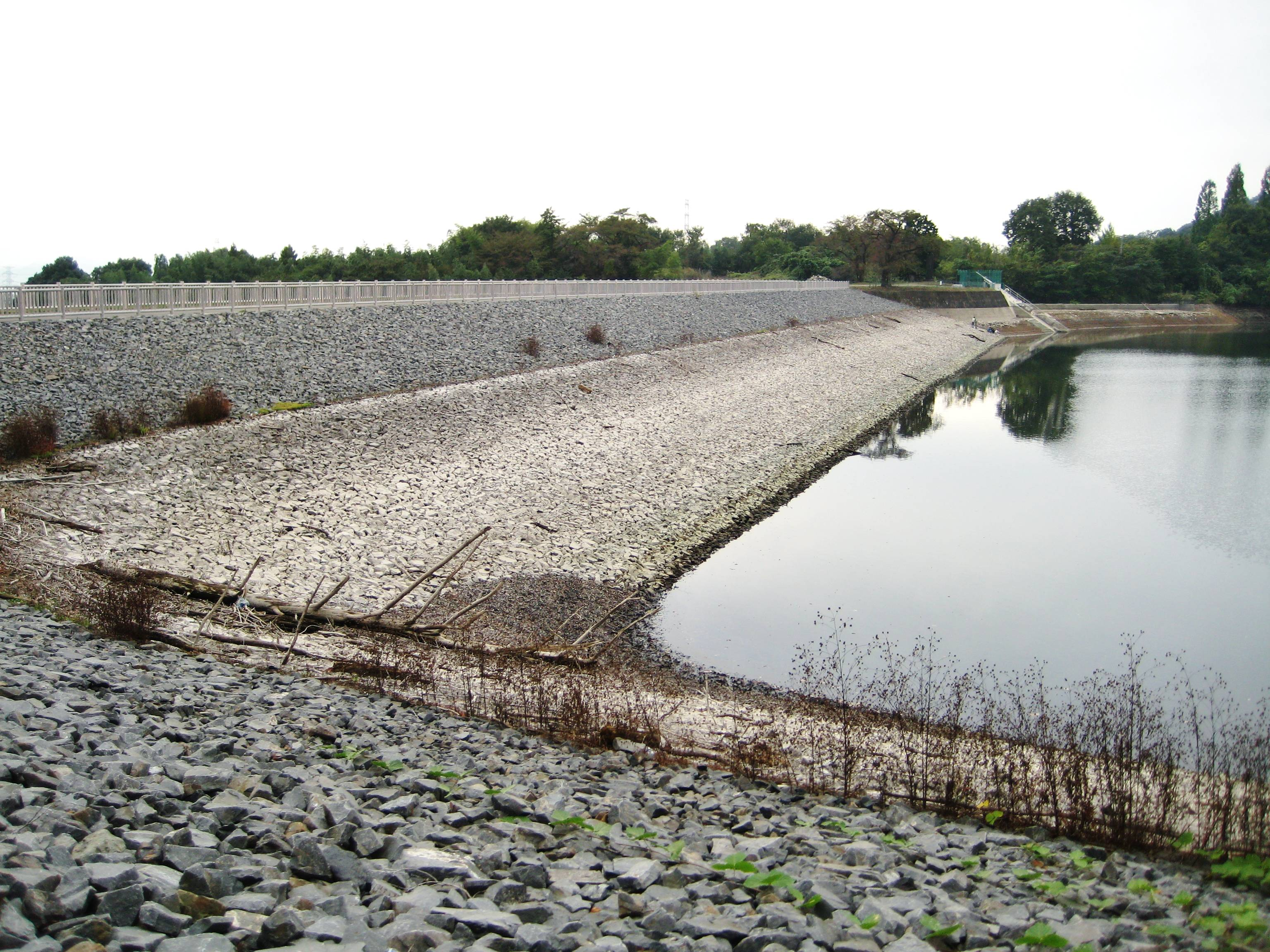

- Location within Japan
- Location: Gunma Prefecture, Japan
- Coordinates: 36°26′05″N 139°15′49″E
- Opening date: 1940

Dam and spillways
- Type of dam: Embankment
- Impounds: Haya River
- Height: 26 m (85 ft)
- Length: 241.8 m (793 ft)

Reservoir
- Creates: Hayakawa Reservoir
- Total capacity: 1,200,000 m^{3} (42,000,000 cu ft)
- Catchment area: 2.9 km^{2} (1.1 sq mi)
- Surface area: 10 hectares

Hayakawa Dam is an earthfill dam located in Gunma Prefecture in Japan. The dam is used for irrigation. The catchment area of the dam is 2.9 km^{2}. The dam impounds about 10 ha of land when full and can store 1.2 million cubic meters of water. The construction of the dam was completed in 1940.
