= Shiozawa Dam =

Dam in Gunma Prefecture, Japan

- Location within Japan
- Location: Gunma Prefecture, Japan
- Coordinates: 36°7′34″N 138°53′22″E
- Construction began: 1984
- Opening date: 1995

Dam and spillways
- Type of dam: Gravity
- Impounds: Shiozawa River
- Height: 38 m (125 ft)
- Length: 157 m (515 ft)

Reservoir
- Total capacity: 303,000 m^{3} (10,700,000 cu ft)
- Catchment area: 7.8 km^{2} (3.0 sq mi)
- Surface area: 3 hectares (7.4 acres)

Shiozawa Dam is a gravity dam located in Gunma Prefecture in Japan. The dam is used for flood control and water supply. The catchment area of the dam is 7.8 km^{2}. The dam impounds about 3 ha of land when full and can store 303 thousand cubic meters of water. The construction of the dam was started on 1984 and completed in 1995.
