= Narusawa Dam =

Dam in Gunma Prefecture, Japan

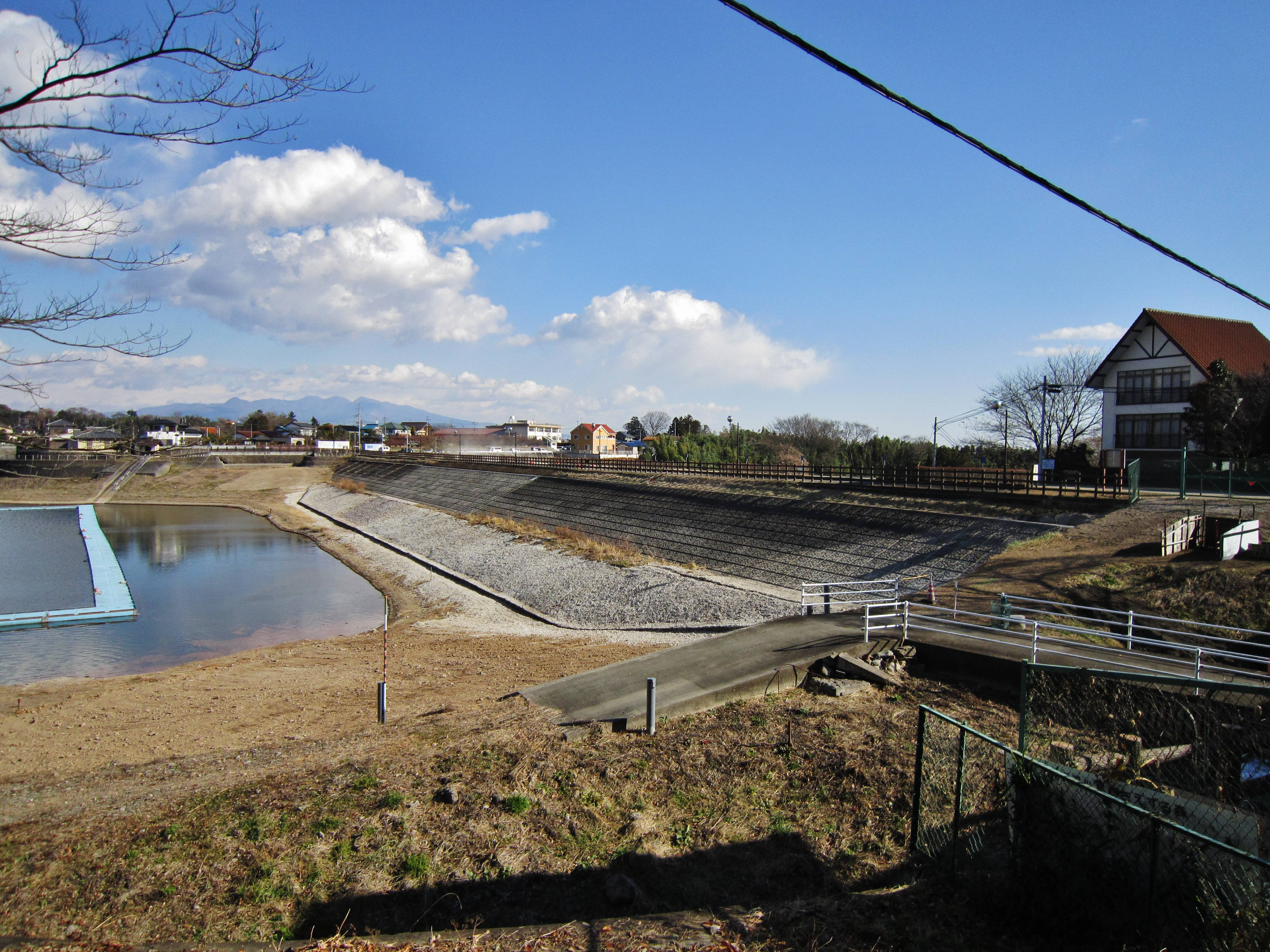

- Location within Japan
- Location: Gunma Prefecture, Japan
- Coordinates: 36°23′20″N 138°56′47″E
- Construction began: 1947
- Opening date: 1949

Dam and spillways
- Type of dam: Embankment
- Height: 21 m (69 ft)
- Length: 313.2 m (1,028 ft)

Reservoir
- Total capacity: 1,283,000 m^{3} (45,300,000 cu ft)
- Catchment area: 2 km^{2} (0.77 sq mi)
- Surface area: 16 hectares

Narusawa Dam is an earthfill dam located in Gunma Prefecture in Japan. The dam is used for irrigation. The catchment area of the dam is 2 km^{2}. The dam impounds about 16 ha of land when full and can store 1283 thousand cubic meters of water. The construction of the dam was started on 1947 and completed in 1949.
