= Ohnita Dam =

Dam in Gunma Prefecture, Japan

- Location within Japan
- Location: Gunma Prefecture, Japan
- Coordinates: 36°8′11″N 138°41′08″E
- Opening date: 2001

Dam and spillways
- Height: 54.4 m (178 ft)
- Length: 163 m (535 ft)

Reservoir
- Total capacity: 437,000 m^{3} (15,400,000 cu ft)
- Catchment area: 4.4 km^{2} (1.7 sq mi)
- Surface area: 3 hectares (7.4 acres)

Ohnita Dam is a gravity dam located in Gunma Prefecture in Japan. The dam is used for flood control and water supply. The catchment area of the dam is 4.4 km^{2}. The dam impounds about 3 ha of land when full and can store 437 thousand cubic meters of water. The construction of the dam was completed in 2001.
