= Marunuma Dam =

Dam in Gunma Prefecture, Japan

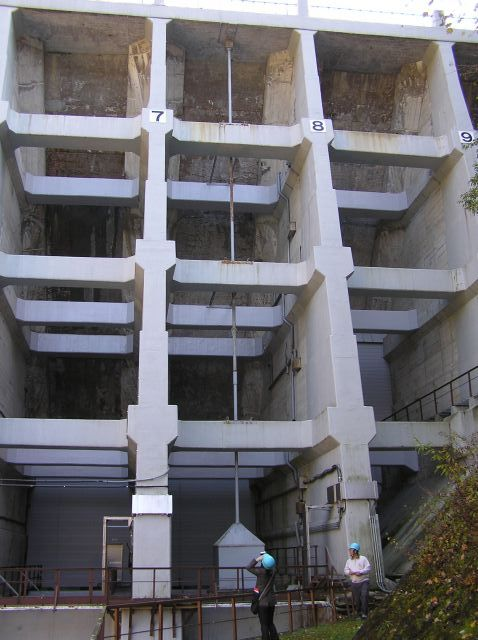

- Location within Japan
- Location: Gunma Prefecture, Japan
- Coordinates: 36°49′26″N 139°20′23″E
- Construction began: 1928
- Opening date: 1931

Dam and spillways
- Type of dam: Buttress
- Height: 32.1 m (105 ft)
- Length: 88.2 m (289 ft)

Reservoir
- Total capacity: 13,600,000 m^{3} (480,000,000 cu ft)
- Catchment area: 25.9 km^{2} (10.0 sq mi)
- Surface area: 68 hectares

Marunuma Dam is a buttress dam located in Gunma Prefecture in Japan. The dam is used for power production. The catchment area of the dam is 25.9 km^{2}. The dam impounds about 68 ha of land when full and can store 13600 thousand cubic meters of water. The construction of the dam was started on 1928 and completed in 1931.
