= Komori Dam (Gunma) =

Dam in Gunma Prefecture, Japan

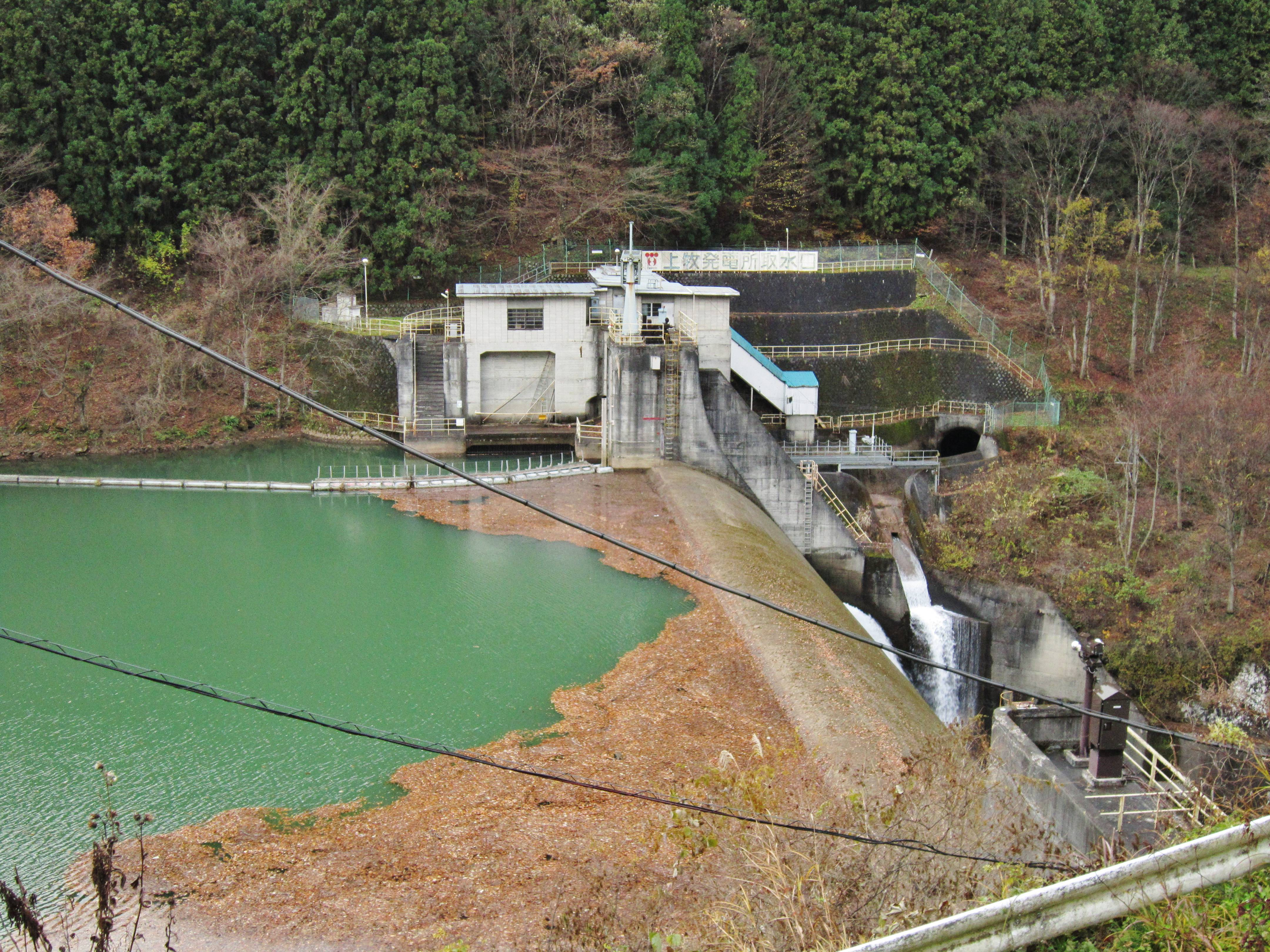

- Location within Japan
- Location: Gunma Prefecture, Japan
- Coordinates: 36°48′16″N 139°1′01″E
- Construction began: 1956
- Opening date: 1958

Dam and spillways
- Type of dam: Gravity
- Impounds: Tone River
- Height: 33 m (108 ft)
- Length: 107.4 m (352 ft)

Reservoir
- Total capacity: 855,000 m^{3} (30,200,000 cu ft)
- Catchment area: 406 km^{2} (157 sq mi)
- Surface area: 10 hectares

Komori Dam (小森ダム, Komori damu) is a gravity dam located in Gunma Prefecture in Japan. The dam is used for power production. The catchment area of the dam is 406 square kilometres (157 sq mi). The dam impounds about 10 hectares (25 acres) of land when full and holds up to 855 thousand cubic metres (30.2 million cubic feet) of water. The construction of the dam was started on 1956 and completed in 1958.
