= Sonohara Dam =

Dam in Gunma Prefecture, Japan

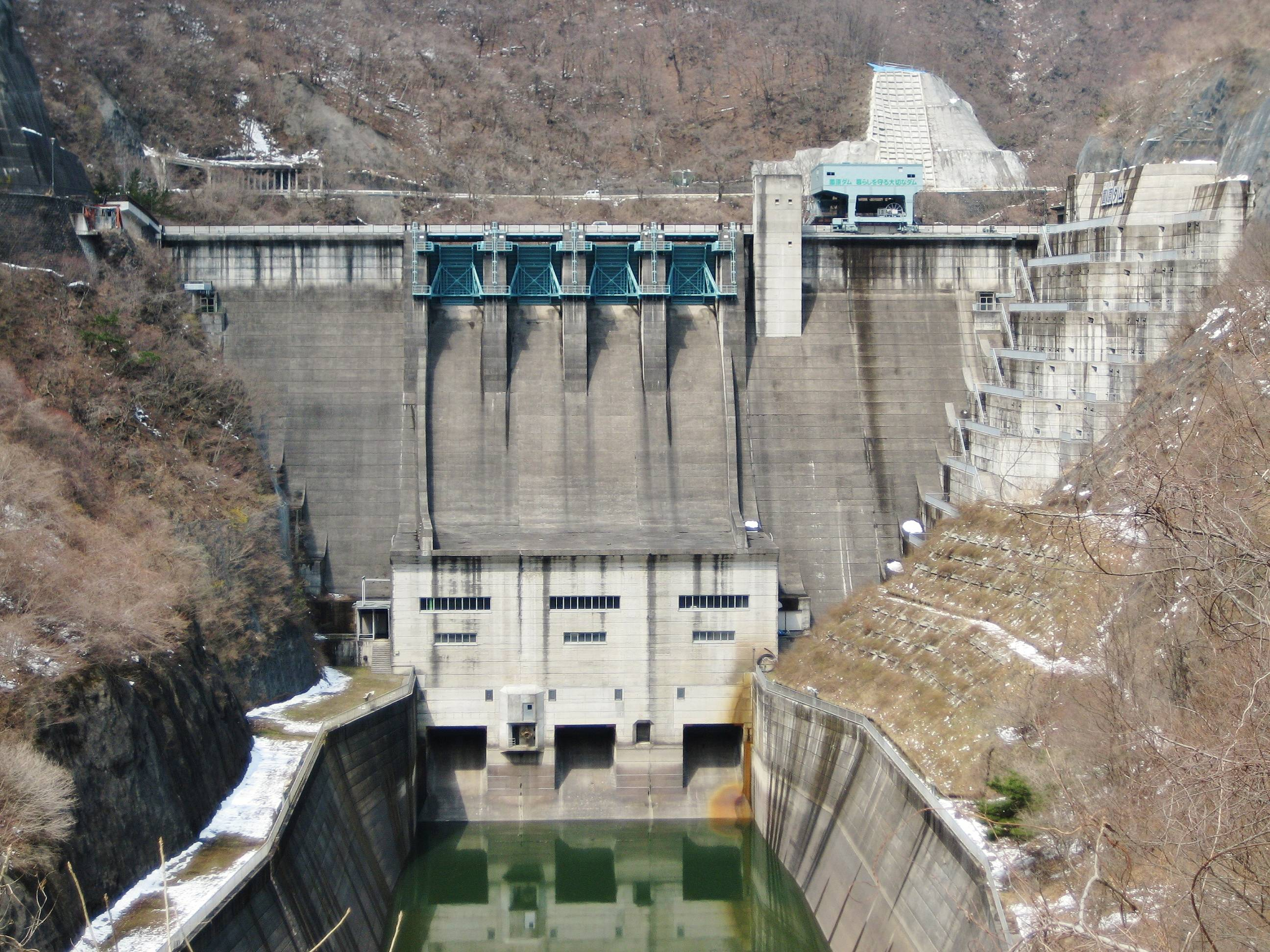
- Interactive map of Sonohara Dam
- Location: Gunma Prefecture, Japan.
- Coordinates: 36°38′20″N 139°10′31″E
- Construction began: 1958
- Opening date: 1965

Dam and spillways
- Type of dam: Gravity
- Height: 76.5 m (251 ft)
- Length: 127.6 m (419 ft)

Reservoir
- Total capacity: 21,310,000 m^{3} (753,000,000 cu ft)
- Catchment area: 607.6 km^{2} (234.6 sq mi)
- Surface area: 91 hectares

Sonohara Dam is a dam in the Gunma Prefecture of Japan.
