= List of dams in Nara Prefecture =

The following is a list of dams in Nara Prefecture, Japan.

== List ==
Name	Location	Opened	Height (meters)	Image
Asahi Dam			86.1	
Futatsuno Dam		1962	76	
Hase Dam			55	
Hiroshiba-ike Dam		1939	18	
Hongo Tameike Dam		1935	23	
Ichinoki Dam		1995	38.4	
Ikehara Dam		1964	111	
Iwaigawa Dam		2008	55	
Kamitsu Dam		2000	63.5	
Kazeya Dam		1960	101	
Kose Dam		1940	36.5	
Kurahashi Tameike Dam		1956	31	
Kurobuchi Dam			13.5	
Miyaoku Dam		1998	36.5	
Muro Dam		1973	63.5	
Nunome Dam		1991	72	
Ōsako Dam		Oct 1973	70.5	
Otaki Dam		2012	100	
Okusato Dam		1960	20.5	
Sakamoto Dam		1962	103	
Sarutani Dam		Apr 1958	74	
Seto Dam			110.5	
Shirakawa Dam		1996	30	
Sugawa Dam		1969	31.5	
Takayama Tameike Dam		1956	23.1	
Tenri Dam		1978	60.5	
Tsuburo Dam		1962	54.3	
Tsuzurao Dam		1937	26.5	

== See also ==
- Media related to Dams in Nara prefecture at Wikimedia Commons
