= Kose Dam =

Kose Dam may refer to:

- Kose Dam (Nara)
- Kose Dam (Gümüşhane)
