= Iseji (Kumano Kodō) =

Route on the Kumano Kodō pilgrimage system

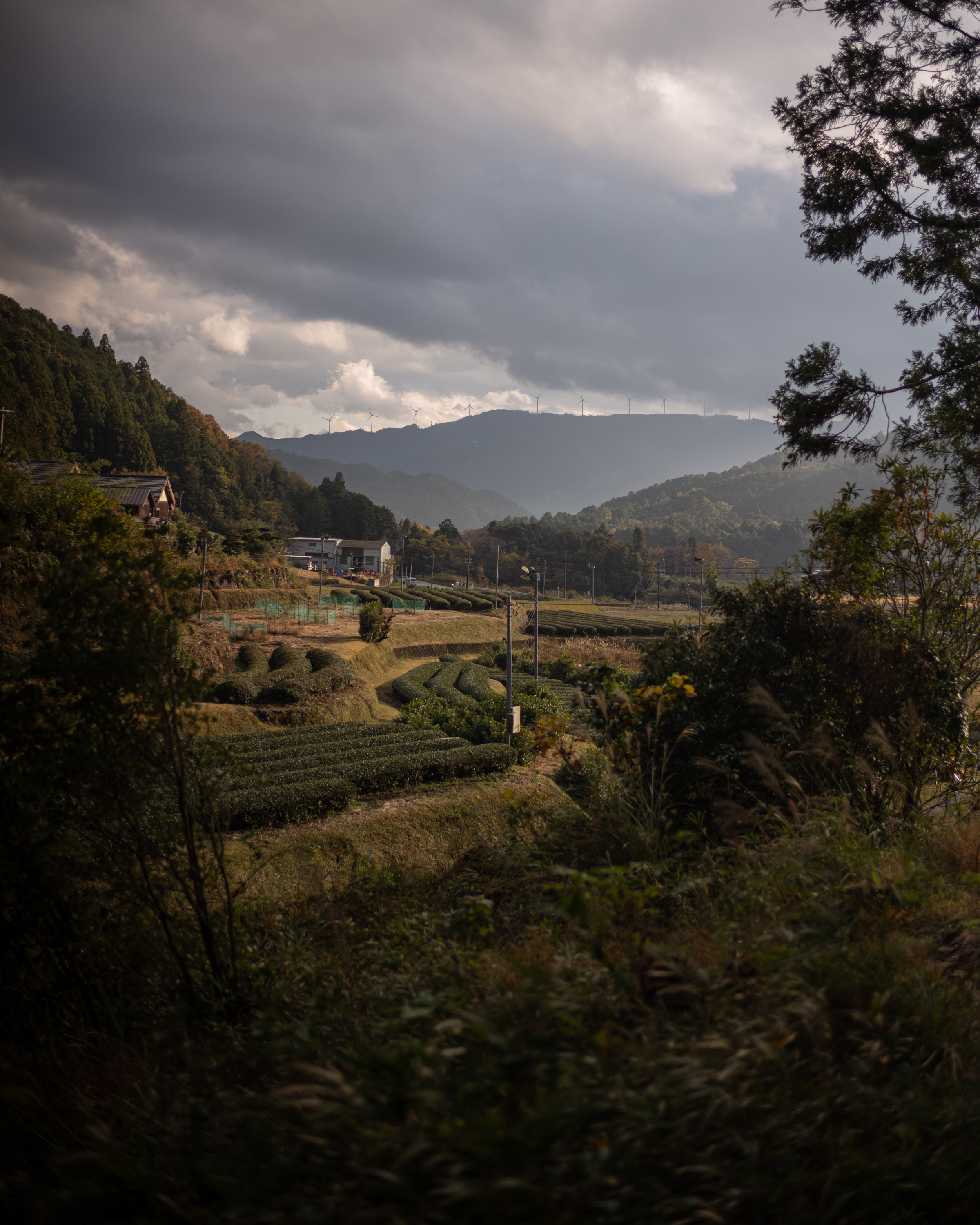
Along the Iseji, near Kawazoe village

The Iseji (伊勢路) is part of the Kumano Kodō (熊野古道) pilgrimage route system. It links the Ise Grand Shrine (伊勢神宮) with the three great shrines of Kumano — Hongu, Nachi, and Hayatama Shrines.

== History ==
The route has existed since at least the Heian Period (794-1185). It was particularly popular during the Edo Period (1603-1868) when travellers to the Ise Grand Shrine would extend their travels further south to the Kumano Shrines.

Along the route are temples and shrines, huge rocks and waterfalls — sacred places where pilgrims pray and prepare for their visit to the main shrines.

The Iseji starts in front of the large Torii Gate of the Inner Shrine of Ise (Naiku). Pilgrims join the busy throng at the Inner Shrine to pray before travelling to the Outer Shrine (Geku). Leaving the crowds of the Grand Shrine behind, pilgrims cross the Miya River, and before long are walking amongst the paddy fields.

The distance between the Grand Shrine of Ise and the Kumano Hayatama Shrine in Shingu City is 170 km. However, a branch route of the Iseji directly to Kumano Hongu Shrine means that the total length of the Iseji is approximately 200 km. The full route takes about two weeks to walk and is enjoyed today by walkers and pilgrims as it has for 1000 years.

== Climate ==
The Kii Mountain Range is one of the wettest in Japan with annual rainfall of approximately 4,000mm. Thanks to this high level of rainfall the Iseji is well endowed with natural beauty. The Miyagawa River has its upper reaches at Mount Odaigahara, the highest mountain in Mie Prefecture (1695m), and its waters are famously pure and clear. The trees making up the environs of Shrines along the way such as Nagashima Shrine and Asuka Shrine are immense. The splendid views of the vast ocean from the tops of mountain passes and from the sands of long beaches are impressive. And the beauty of the “3600 peaks of the Kii mountains” is well known. Indeed the layers of mountains through the Kii Peninsula make it a particularly photogenic and spiritual place.

== UNESCO World Heritage Listing ==
Part of the Iseji was listed in the “Kumano Kodō Pilgrimage Routes” as a National Heritage in 2000. And the listed part of the Iseji was extended again in 2002. In July 2004 part of the Iseji was included in the UNESCO World Heritage Sites of the “Sacred Sites and Pilgrimage Routes in the Kii Mountain Range”. Today a total length of 32.9km in numerous sections of the Iseji is part of the UNESCO World Heritage listing.

Recent focus on the Kumano Kodō Pilgrimage Route has been on the ancient aristocratic routes along the Wakayama Prefecture side of the Peninsula. Indeed, it was not until the 1980s that much attention was paid to the route used by commoners - the Iseji. Locals had realised the historic importance of the route in the 1970s and had travelled into the mountains and repaired the old trails. They started to participate in “Kodō Walking” weekends where the old trails, their nature and views were enjoyed.

In 1994 Mie Prefecture and the eight cities, towns and villages of the Eastern Kishu area formed a committee to consider the restoration of the old Kumano Kodo Iseji. A detailed study of the old road was commenced. Even so the energy devoted to this project through the UNESCO World Heritage Listing Project was far less than the energy devoted by Wakayama and Nara Prefectures. However, an article about the importance of the Iseji in the magazine “Isejin” (a magazine dealing with the culture of the Ise area) caught the imagination of locals and was responsible for the energy which would eventually lead to Iseji’s including in the UNESCO listing. The problem was actually part of the charm of the Iseji in that locals considered the old pilgrimage route as so integral to their lives that they did not even consider a world heritage listing was possible.

On 10 February 2007 the Mie Prefecture Kumano Kodō Center was opened in Mukai, Owase City. The Center acts as the Eastern gate to the area of the UNESCO “Sacred Sites and Pilgrimage Routes in the Kii Mountain Range.” It also acts as a research centre for the protection and use of the Iseji and a museum for visitors about the Iseji’s history, nature, and culture. An NPO called the Kumano Kodo Nature, History and Culture Network is responsible for the operation of the Centre.

In 2012 there were 273,673 visitors, an increase of 9.3% from the year before. 2014 was the 10th anniversary of the UNESCO Heritage Listing and due to special projects visitors exceeded 429,000 with an economic benefit of JPY2.17 billion yen (USD$21 million).

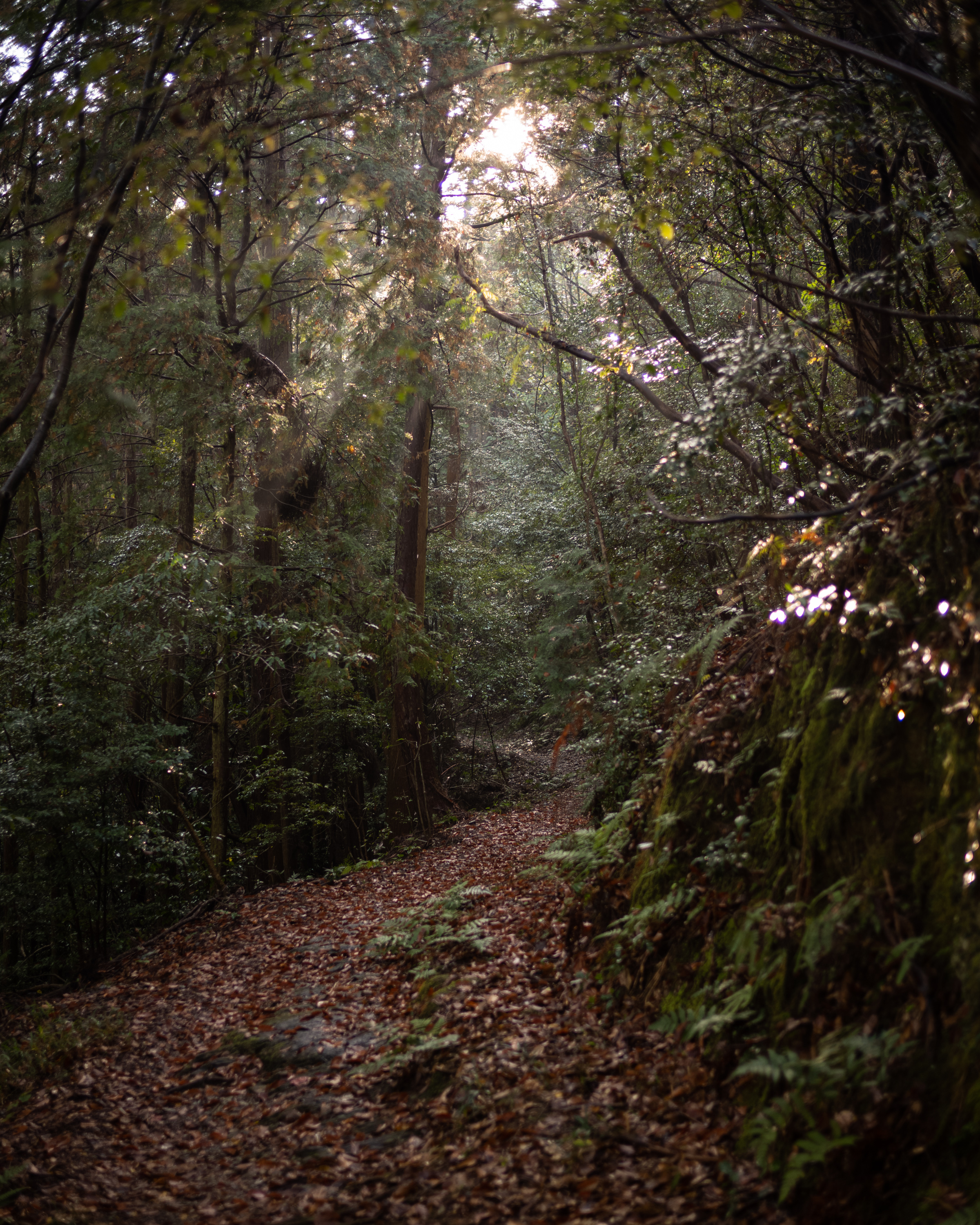
The Iseji, climbing up towards Meki Tōge

== Local Culture ==
The Iseji travels first across the Ise Plain, then into the Oku-Ise Mountains, and then along the Kumano Coast. The food available along the way changes too. The Ise Plain produces high quality rice for the table and for Sake making. The Oku-Ise mountains produce high quality tea. And the plateaus among the mountains are famous for dairy and ice cream. Along the Kumano coastline are a myriad of fishing villages and plentiful catches. The mountains also produce wild boar and deer meat. As the scenery along the Iseji changes so does the cuisine.

The destination for Iseji pilgrims are the three Shrines of Kumano, the Main Hongu Shrine in the interior along the middle reaches of the Kumano River, the Hayatama Shrine at the mouth of the Kumano River (Shingu City), and the Nachi Shrine at the Nachi Waterfall.

== In Literature ==
The Iseji makes an appearance in the famous late-Edo Period novel “Tokaido-chu Hizakurige” (東海道中膝栗毛) (available in translation as “Shank’s Mare — Japan’s great comic novel of travel and ribaldry” by Ikku Jippensha, translated by Thomas Satchell). In the novel Edo period travellers are implored to travel at least “Seven times to Ise, Three times to Kumano” in their lifetime. And 18th and 19th century commoners took this to heart. Indeed the two routes to Kumano were split along class lines, the aristocracy mainly taking the Kii-ji routes on the Western side of the Kii Peninsular (Wakayama Prefecture), and commoners take the Iseji route on the Eastern side (Mie Prefecture).
