= Tsuburo Dam =

Dam in Nara Prefecture, Japan

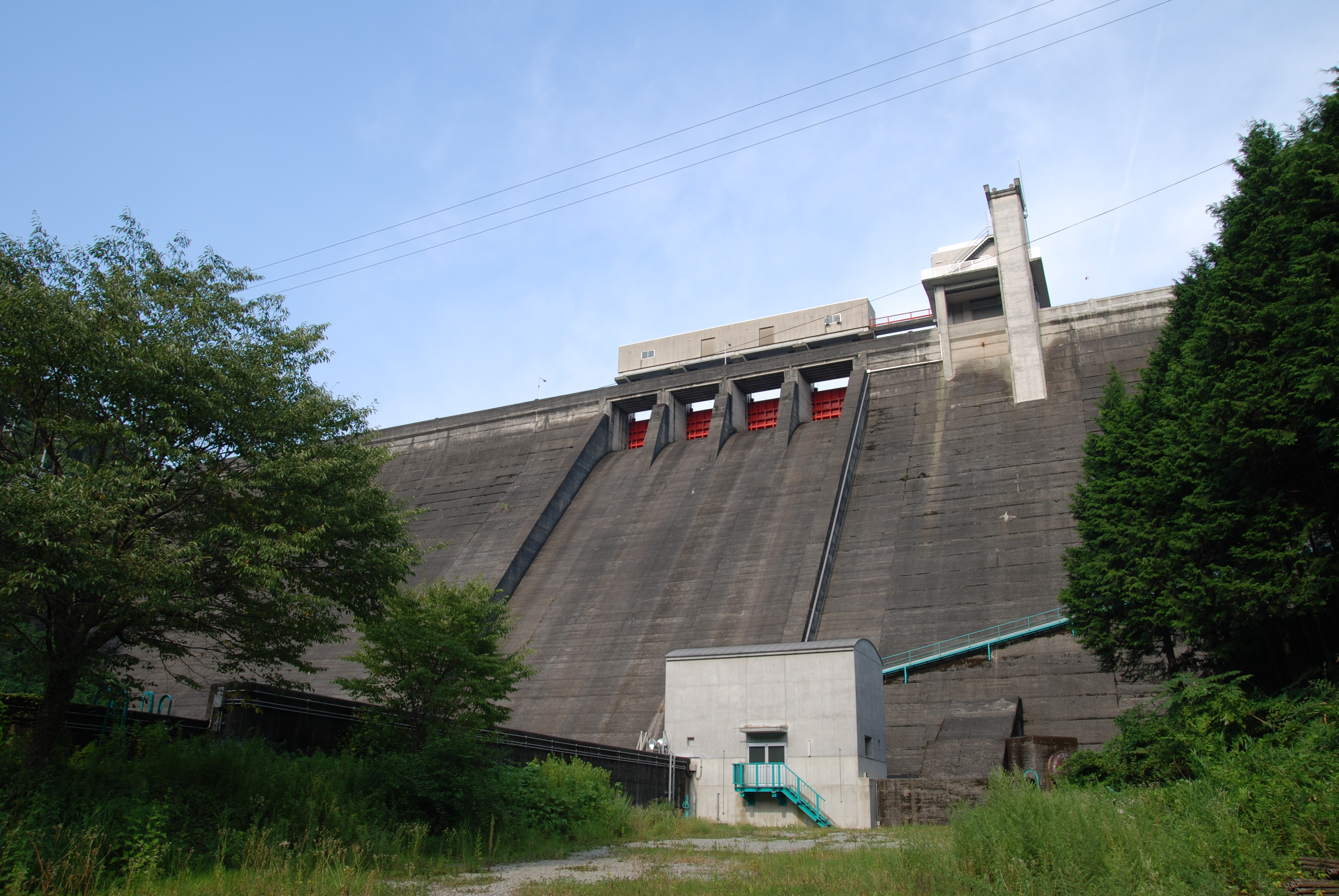
- Location: Nara Prefecture, Japan
- Coordinates: 34°23′58″N 135°53′28″E
- Construction began: 1952
- Opening date: 1962

Dam and spillways
- Height: 54.3m
- Length: 240m

Reservoir
- Total capacity: 25650 thousand cubic meters
- Catchment area: 38.8 sq. km
- Surface area: 150 hectares

Tsuburo Dam is a concrete gravity dam located in Nara prefecture in Japan. The dam is used for agriculture and water supply. The catchment area of the dam is 38.8 km^{2}. The dam impounds about 150 ha of land when full and can store 25650 thousand cubic meters of water. The construction of the dam was started on 1952 and completed in 1962.
