= Miyaoku Dam =

Dam in Nara Prefecture, Japan

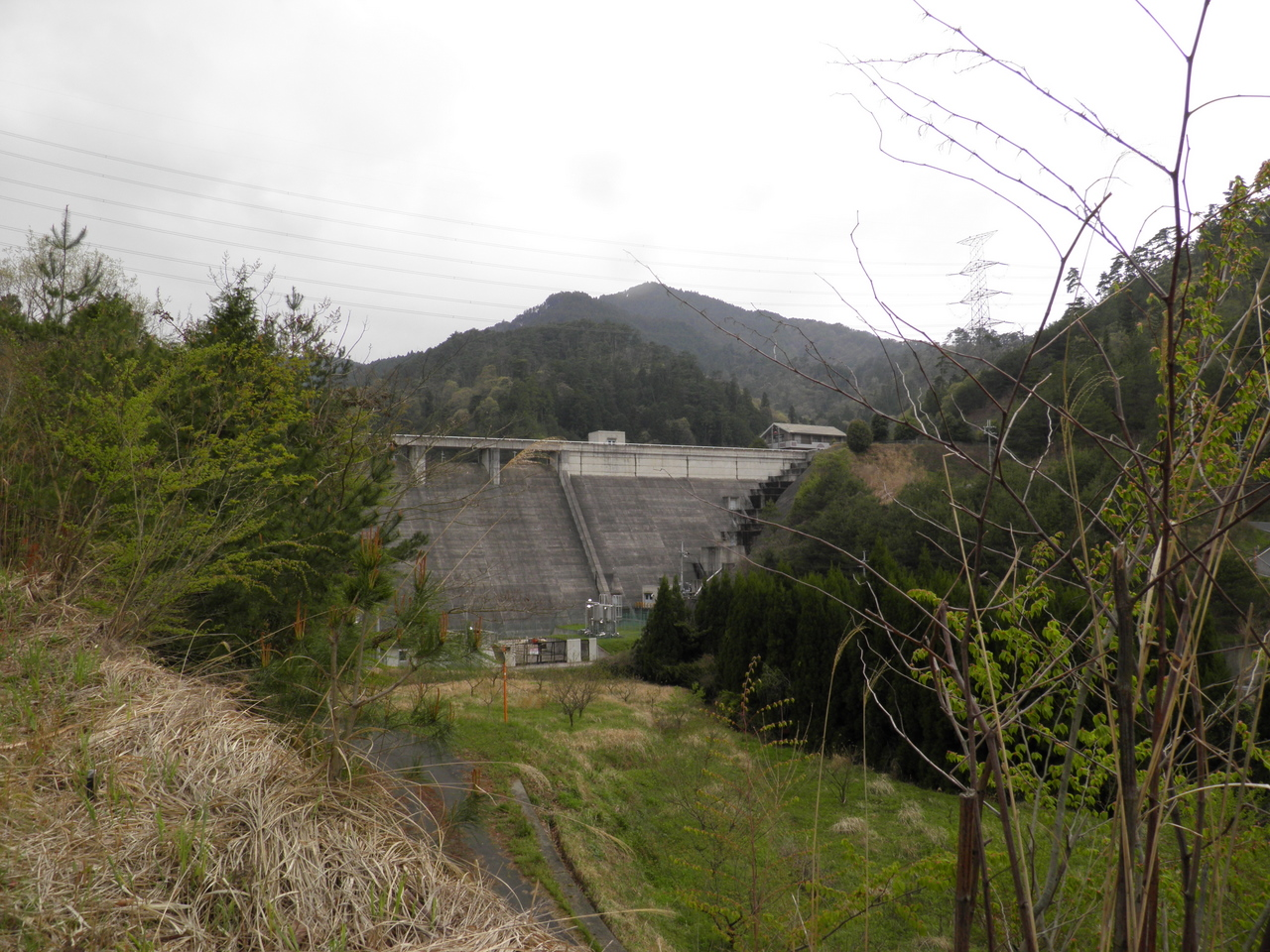
- Location: Nara Prefecture, Japan
- Coordinates: 34°27′21″N 135°54′33″E
- Construction began: 1983
- Opening date: 1998

Dam and spillways
- Height: 36.5m
- Length: 175m

Reservoir
- Total capacity: 580 thousand cubic meters
- Catchment area: 2.9 sq. km
- Surface area: 5 hectares

Miyaoku Dam is a concrete gravity dam located in Nara prefecture in Japan. The dam is used for agriculture and water supply. The catchment area of the dam is 2.9 km^{2}. The dam impounds about 5 ha of land when full and can store 580 thousand cubic meters of water. The construction of the dam was started on 1983 and completed in 1998.
