= Futatsuno Dam =

Dam in Nara Prefecture, Japan

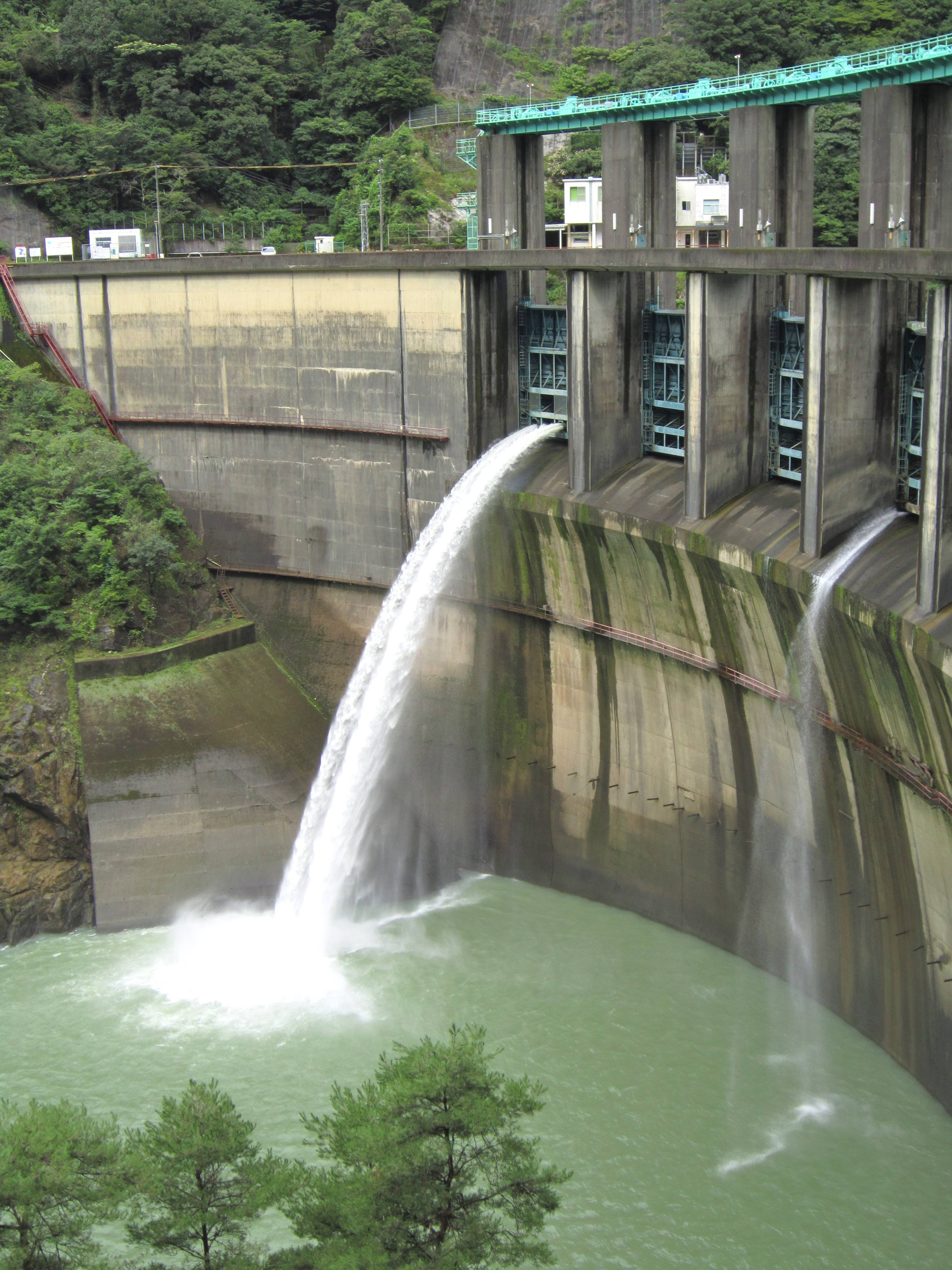
- Location: Nara Prefecture, Japan
- Coordinates: 33°54′34″N 135°46′58″E
- Construction began: 1959
- Opening date: 1962

Dam and spillways
- Impounds: Kumano River
- Height: 76m
- Length: 210.6m

Reservoir
- Total capacity: 43000 thousand cubic meters
- Catchment area: 801
- Surface area: 230 hectares

Futatsuno Dam is an arch dam located in Nara prefecture in Japan. The dam is used for power production. The catchment area of the dam is 801 km^{2}. The dam impounds about 230 ha of land when full and can store 43000 thousand cubic meters of water. The construction of the dam was started in 1959 and completed in 1962. It impounds the Kumano River.
