= Tenri Dam =

Dam in Nara Prefecture, Japan

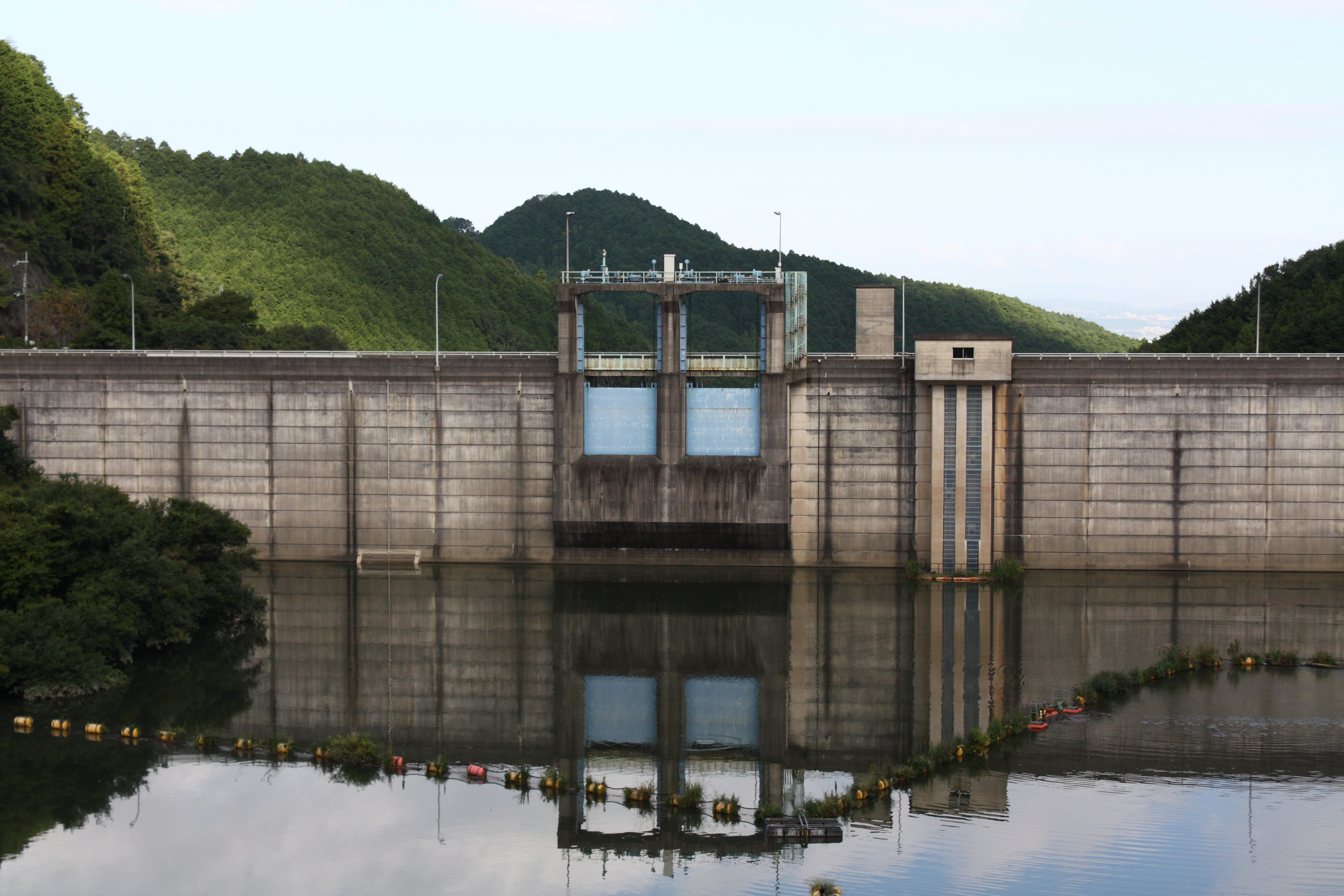
- Interactive map of Tenri Dam
- Location: Nara Prefecture, Japan
- Construction began: 1970
- Opening date: 1978

Dam and spillways
- Height: 60.5m
- Length: 210m

Reservoir
- Total capacity: 2500 thousand cubic meters
- Catchment area: 10.7 sq. km
- Surface area: 18 hectares

Tenri Dam is a concrete gravity dam located in Nara prefecture in Japan. The dam is used for flood control and water supply. The catchment area of the dam is 10.7 km^{2}. The dam impounds about 18 ha of land when full and can store 2500 thousand cubic meters of water. The construction of the dam was started on 1970 and completed in 1978.
