= Sarutani Dam =

Dam in Nara Prefecture, Japan

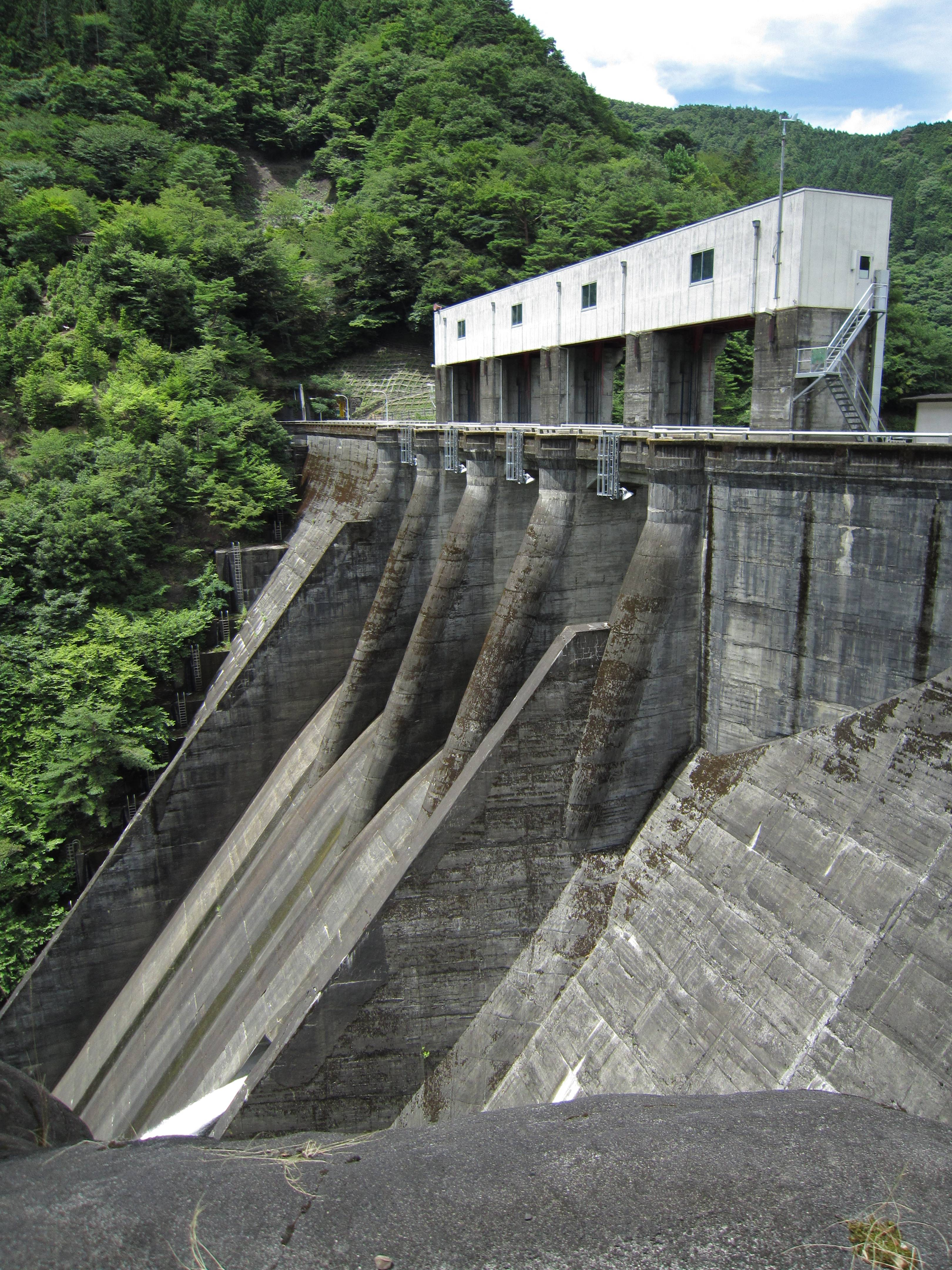
- Location: Nara Prefecture, Japan
- Coordinates: 34°10′46″N 135°44′29″E
- Construction began: 1950
- Opening date: 1957

Dam and spillways
- Impounds: Kumano River
- Height: 74m
- Length: 170m

Reservoir
- Total capacity: 23300 thousand cubic meters
- Catchment area: 214.9 sq. km
- Surface area: 100 hectares

Sarutani Dam is a concrete gravity dam located in Nara prefecture in Japan. The dam is used for power production. The catchment area of the dam is 214.9 km^{2}. The dam impounds about 100 ha of land when full and can store 23300 thousand cubic meters of water. The construction of the dam was started in 1950 and completed in 1957. It impounds the Kumano River.
