= Kazeya Dam =

Dam in Nara Prefecture, Japan

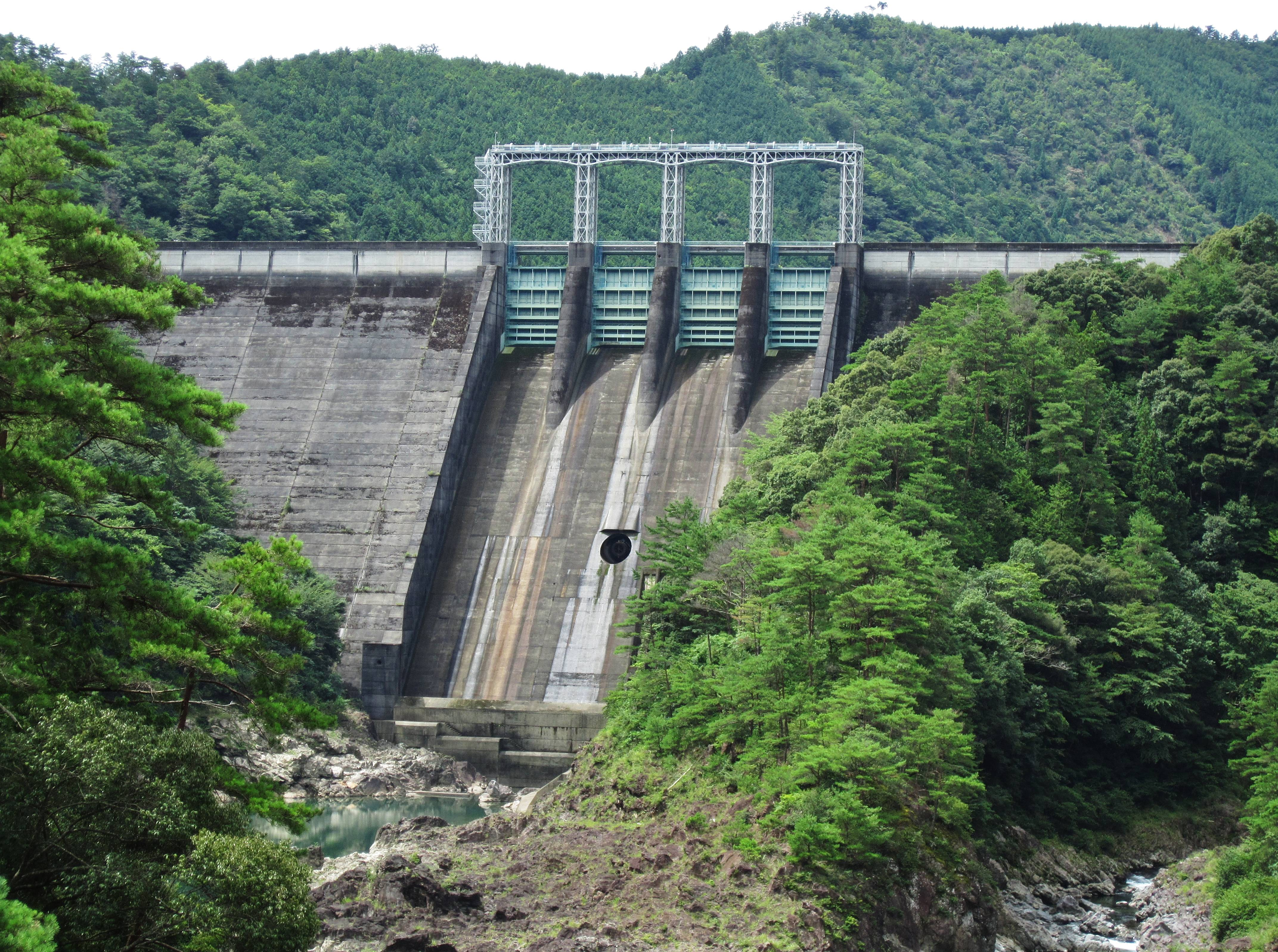
- Location: Nara Prefecture, Japan
- Coordinates: 34°2′40″N 135°47′16″E
- Construction began: 1954
- Opening date: 1960

Dam and spillways
- Impounds: Kumano River
- Height: 101m
- Length: 329.5m

Reservoir
- Total capacity: 130000 thousand cubic meters
- Catchment area: 553 sq. km
- Surface area: 446 hectares

Kazeya Dam is a concrete gravity dam located in Yoshino District, Nara Prefecture in Japan. The dam is used for power production. The catchment area of the dam is 553 km^{2}. The dam impounds about 446 ha of land when full and can store 130000 thousand cubic meters of water. The construction of the dam was started on 1954 and completed in 1960. It impounds the Kumano River.
