= Ichinoki Dam =

Dam in Nara Prefecture, Japan

- Interactive map of Ichinoki Dam
- Location: Nara Prefecture, Japan
- Coordinates: 34°19′44″N 135°43′29″E
- Construction began: 1974
- Opening date: 1995

Dam and spillways
- Height: 38.4m
- Length: 150m

Reservoir
- Total capacity: 1570 thousand cubic meters
- Catchment area: 6.9 sq. km
- Surface area: 14 hectares

Ichinoki Dam is a concrete gravity dam located in Nara prefecture in Japan. The dam is used for agriculture. The catchment area of the dam is 6.9 km^{2}. The dam impounds about 14 ha of land when full and can store 1570 thousand cubic meters of water. The construction of the dam was started in 1974 and completed in 1995.
