= Sugawa Dam =

Dam in Nara Prefecture, Japan

- Location: Nara Prefecture, Japan
- Construction began: 1959
- Opening date: 1969

Dam and spillways
- Height: 31.5m
- Length: 107m

Reservoir
- Total capacity: 797
- Catchment area: 124.2
- Surface area: 13 hectares

Sugawa Dam is an arch dam located in Nara prefecture in Japan. The dam is used for water supply. The catchment area of the dam is 124.2 km^{2}. The dam impounds about 13 ha of land when full and can store 797 thousand cubic meters of water. The construction of the dam was started on 1959 and completed in 1969.
