= Ikehara Dam =

Dam in Nara Prefecture, Japan

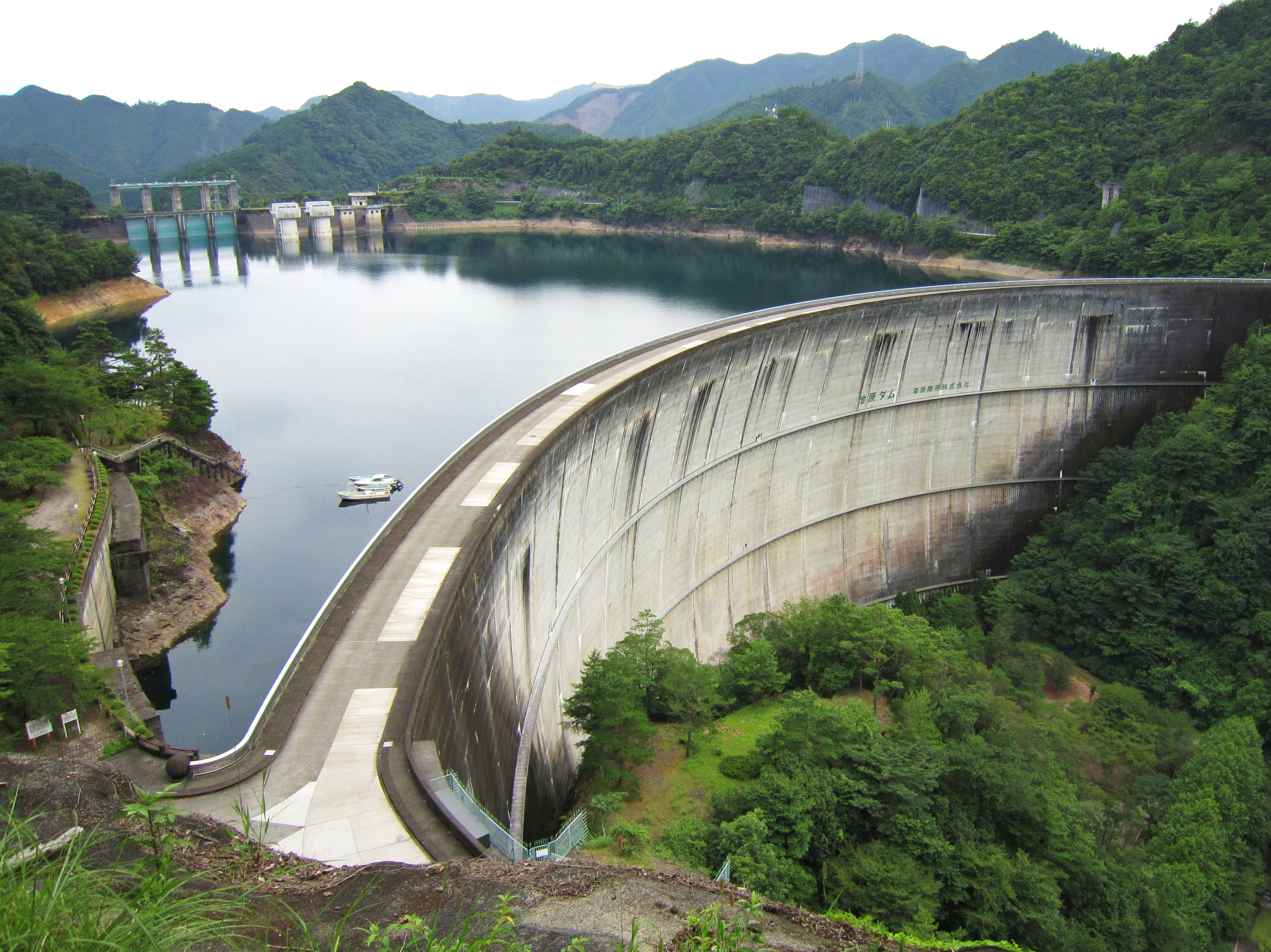
- Interactive map of Ikehara Dam
- Location: Nara Prefecture, Japan
- Coordinates: 34°2′49″N 135°58′16″E
- Construction began: 1962
- Opening date: 1964

Dam and spillways
- Height: 111m
- Length: 460m

Reservoir
- Total capacity: 338373 thousand cubic meters
- Catchment area: 300 sq. km
- Surface area: 843 hectares

Ikehara Dam is an arch dam located in Nara prefecture in Japan. The dam is used for power production. The catchment area of the dam is 300 km^{2}. The dam impounds about 843 ha of land when full and can store 338373 thousand cubic meters of water. The construction of the dam was started on 1962 and completed in 1964.
