= Hiroshiba-ike Dam =

Dam in Nara Prefecture, Japan

- Location: Nara Prefecture, Japan
- Coordinates: 34°30′25″N 135°57′42″E
- Opening date: 1939

Dam and spillways
- Height: 18m
- Length: 41m

Reservoir
- Total capacity: 16 thousand cubic meters
- Surface area: 1 hectares

Hiroshiba-ike Dam is an earthen dam located in Nara prefecture in Japan. The dam is used for agriculture. The catchment area of the dam is km^{2}. The dam impounds about 1 ha of land when full and can store 16 thousand cubic meters of water. The construction of the dam was completed in 1939.
