= Iwaigawa Dam =

Dam in Nara Prefecture, Japan

- Location: Nara Prefecture, Japan
- Coordinates: 34°39′38″N 135°52′11″E
- Construction began: 1974
- Opening date: 2008

Dam and spillways
- Height: 55m
- Length: 181m

Reservoir
- Total capacity: 810 thousand cubic meters
- Catchment area: 3.3 sq. km
- Surface area: 5 hectares

Iwaigawa Dam is a concrete gravity dam located in Nara prefecture in Japan. The dam is used for flood control. The catchment area of the dam is 3.3 km^{2}. The dam impounds about 5 ha of land when full and can store 810 thousand cubic meters of water. The construction of the dam was started in 1974 and completed in 2008.
