= Kumano River =

Coordinates: 33°43′54″N 136°00′00″E

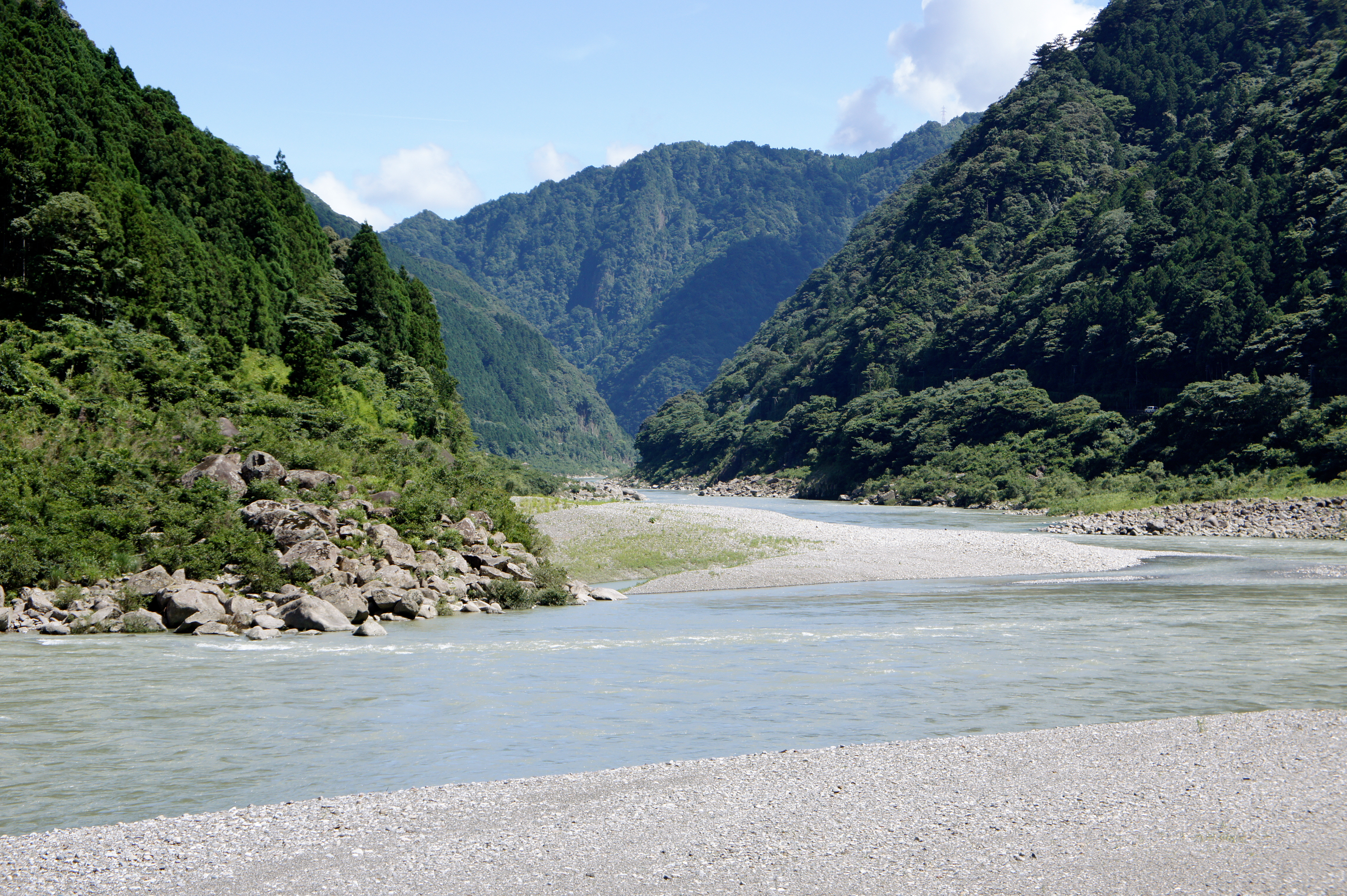
- Kumano River at Shingū, Wakayama

- Location within Japan
- Native name: 熊野川 (Japanese)

Location
- Country: Japan

Physical characteristics
- Source
  - location: Mount Ōmine
  - elevation: 1,719 m (5,640 ft)
- Mouth
  - location: Pacific Ocean
  - elevation: 0 m (0 ft)
- Length: 183 km (114 mi)
- Basin size: 2,360 km^{2} (910 sq mi)
- Discharge
  - average: 119.2 m^{3}/s (4,210 cu ft/s)

The Kumano River (熊野川, Kumanogawa) is a Class A river in the Kii Peninsula of central Japan, located in Nara, Wakayama and Mie Prefectures. It is 183 kilometres (114 mi) long and has a watershed of 2,630 square kilometres (1,020 sq mi).

The river rises from Mount Ōmine in the Yoshino-Kumano National Park in Tenkawa, Nara and follows a generally southward course to drain into the Pacific Ocean on the border between Shingū, Wakayama and Kihō, Mie. The river is part of the Sacred Sites and Pilgrimage Routes in the Kii Mountain Range, a UNESCO World Heritage Site which incorporates nature scenery of the Kii peninsula with numerous Buddhist temples and Shinto shrines forming a pilgrimage route.

Municipalities through which the river passes are:

- Nara Prefecture
  - Tenkawa, Nara
  - Gojō, Nara
  - Totsukawa, Nara
- Wakayama Prefecture
  - Tanabe, Wakayama
  - Shingū, Wakayama
- Mie Prefecture
  - Kumano, Mie
  - Kihō, Mie

== Hydropower ==
There are eleven dams in the Kumano basin for generation of hydropower. Five of these are on the Kumano itself (from source to mouth):

- Kawasako Dam
- Tsuzurao Dam
- Sarutani Dam
- Kazeya Dam
- Futatsuno Dam

The other six dams are on tributaries of the Kumano.
