= Sakamoto Dam (Nara) =

Dam in Nara Prefecture, Japan

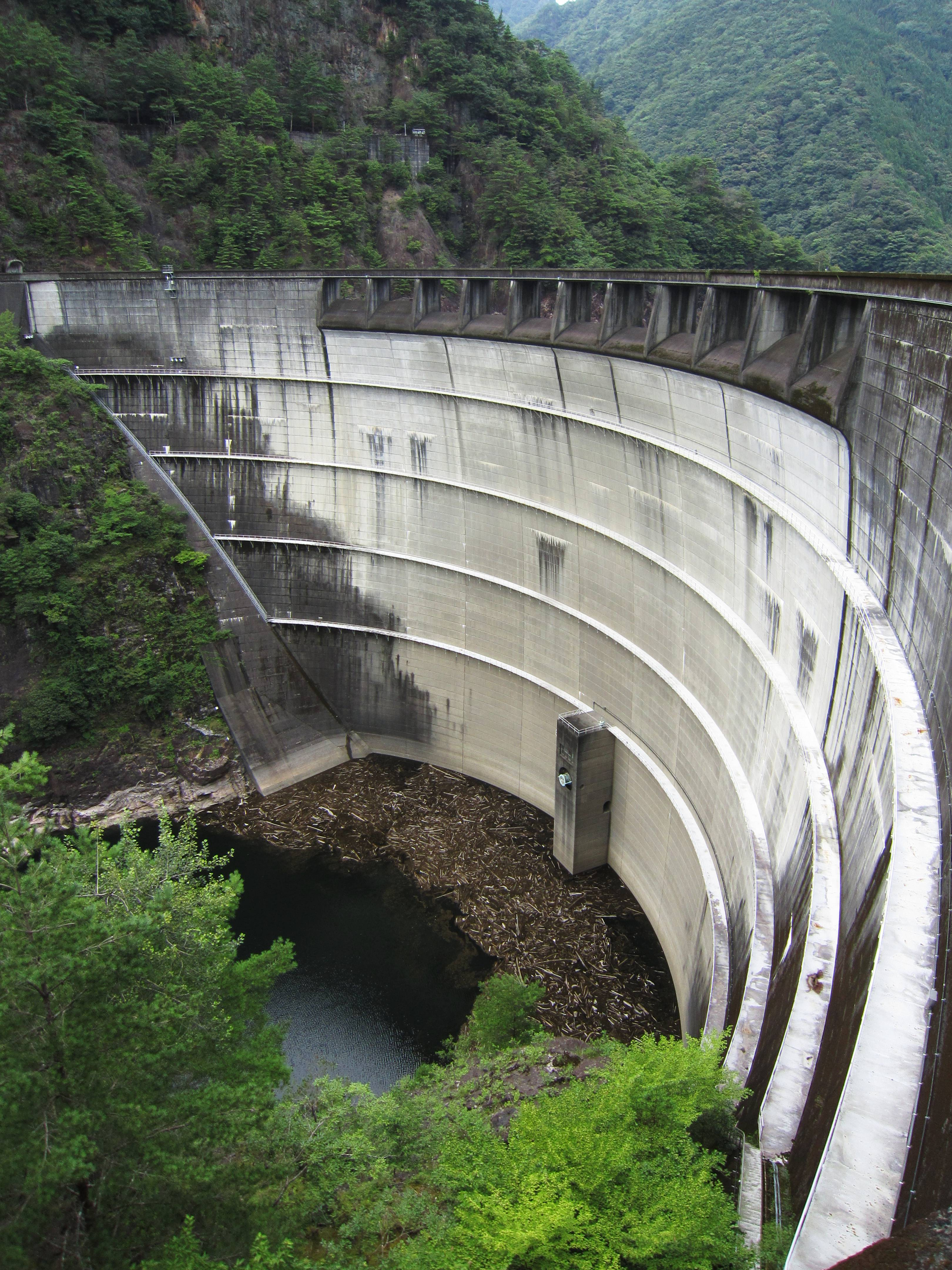
- Interactive map of Sakamoto Dam
- Location: Nara Prefecture, Japan
- Coordinates: 34°5′27″N 136°3′03″E
- Construction began: 1959
- Opening date: 1962

Dam and spillways
- Height: 103m
- Length: 256.3m

Reservoir
- Total capacity: 87000 thousand cubic meters
- Catchment area: 101 sq. km
- Surface area: 259 hectares

Sakamoto Dam is an arch dam located in Nara prefecture in Japan. The dam is used for power generation. The catchment area of the dam is 101 km^{2}. The dam impounds about 259 ha of land when full and can store 87000 thousand cubic meters of water. The construction of the dam was started on 1959 and completed in 1962.
