= Kamitsu Dam =

Dam in Nara Prefecture, Japan

- Location: Nara Prefecture, Japan
- Coordinates: 34°40′18″N 136°1′39″E
- Construction began: 1975
- Opening date: 2000

Dam and spillways
- Height: 63.5m
- Length: 264m

Reservoir
- Total capacity: 5600 thousand cubic meters
- Catchment area: 18.9 sq. km
- Surface area: 33 hectares

Kamitsu Dam is a gravity dam located in Nara prefecture in Japan. The dam is used for agriculture and water supply. The catchment area of the dam is 18.9 km^{2}. The dam impounds about 33 ha of land when full and can store 5600 thousand cubic meters of water. The construction of the dam was started on 1975 and completed in 2000.
