= Murō Dam =

Dam in Nara Prefecture, Japan

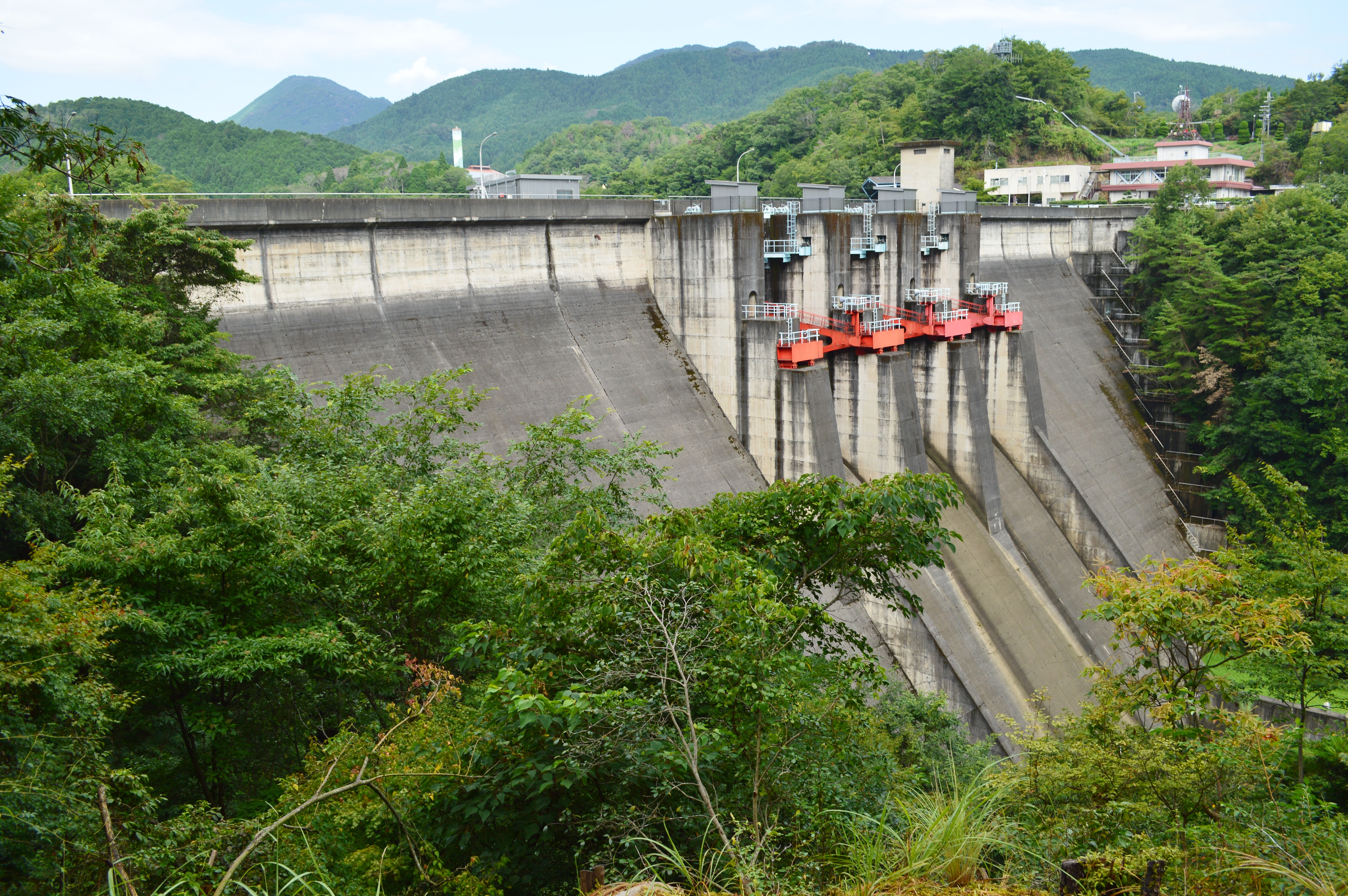
- Interactive map of Murō Dam
- Location: Nara Prefecture, Japan
- Coordinates: 34°33′19″N 136°0′25″E
- Construction began: 1966
- Opening date: 1973

Dam and spillways
- Height: 63.5m
- Length: 175m

Reservoir
- Total capacity: 16900 thousand cubic meters
- Catchment area: 169 sq. km
- Surface area: 105 hectares

Murō Dam is a concrete gravity dam located in Nara prefecture in Japan. The dam is used for flood control and water supply. The catchment area of the dam is 169 km^{2}. The dam impounds about 105 ha of land when full and can store 16900 thousand cubic meters of water. The construction of the dam was started in 1966 and completed in 1973.
