= Shirakawa Dam (Nara) =

Dam in Nara Prefecture, Japan

- Interactive map of Shirakawa Dam
- Location: Nara Prefecture, Japan
- Coordinates: 34.6225°N 135.8488°E
- Construction began: 1971
- Opening date: 1996

Dam and spillways
- Height: 30m
- Length: 516m

Reservoir
- Total capacity: 1360 thousand cubic meters
- Catchment area: 6 sq. km
- Surface area: 15 hectares

Shirakawa Dam is an earth-fill dam located in Nara prefecture in Japan. The dam is used for agriculture. The catchment area of the dam is 6 km^{2}. The dam impounds about 15 ha of land when full and can store 1360 thousand cubic meters of water. The construction of the dam was started in 1971 and completed in 1996.
