= Tsuzurao Dam =

Dam in Nara Prefecture, Japan

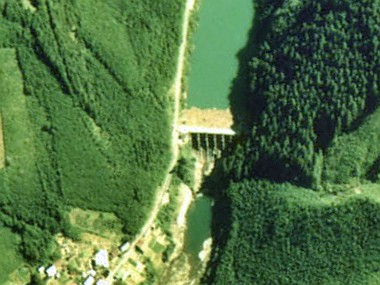
- Interactive map of Tsuzurao Dam
- Location: Nara Prefecture, Japan
- Coordinates: 34°12′47″N 135°50′06″E
- Construction began: 1936
- Opening date: 1937

Dam and spillways
- Impounds: Kumano River
- Height: 26.5m
- Length: 98.2m

Reservoir
- Total capacity: 1137 thousand cubic meters
- Catchment area: 120.4 sq. km
- Surface area: 15 hectares

Tsuzurao Dam is a concrete gravity dam located in Nara prefecture in Japan. The dam is used for power production. The catchment area of the dam is 120.4 km^{2}. The dam impounds about 15 ha of land when full and can store 1137 thousand cubic meters of water. The construction of the dam was started in 1936 and completed in 1937. It impounds the Kumano River.
