= Nunome Dam =

Dam in Nara Prefecture, Japan

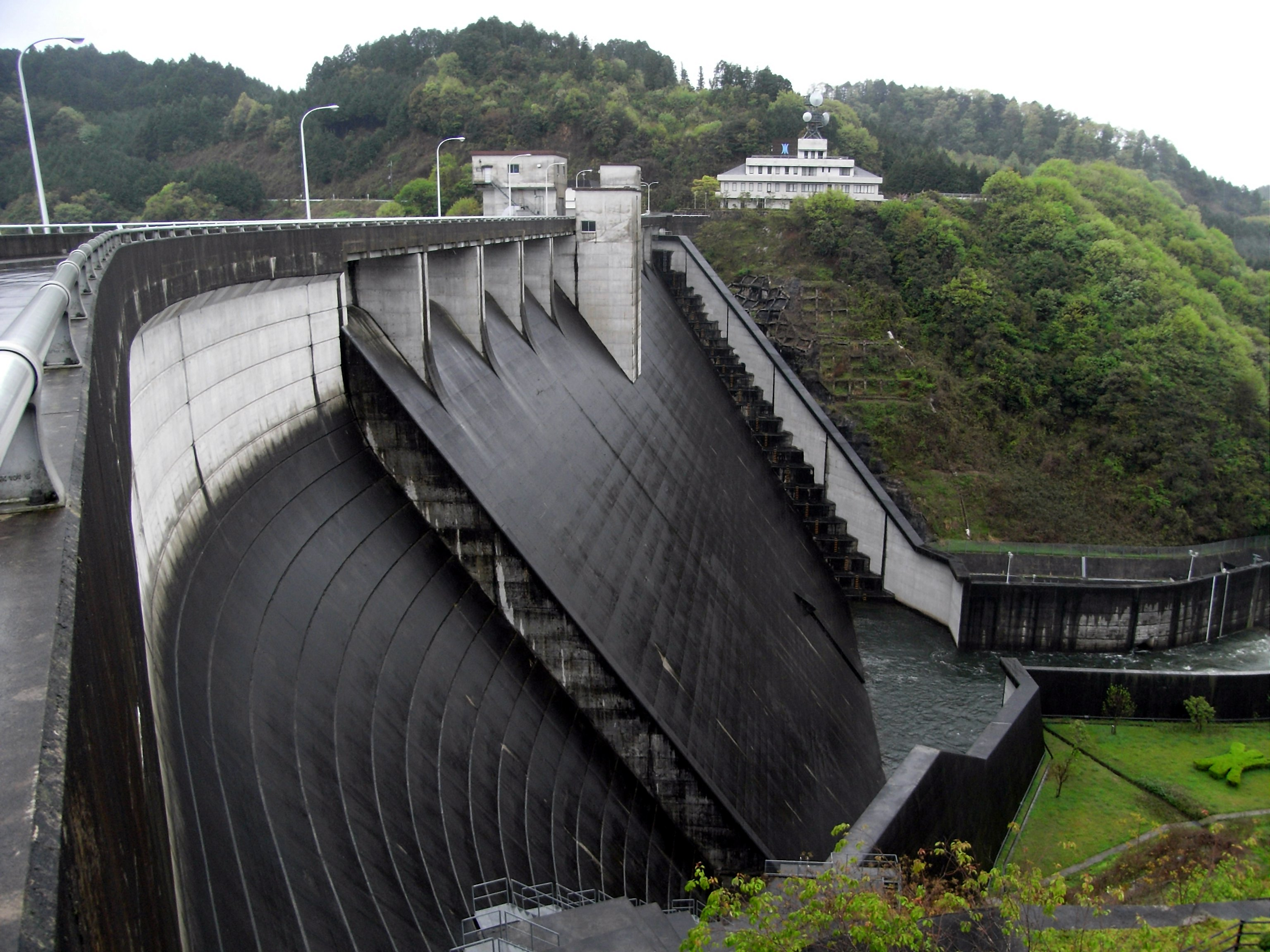
- Location: Nara Prefecture, Japan
- Coordinates: 34°41′59″N 135°58′41″E
- Construction began: 1975
- Opening date: 1991

Dam and spillways
- Height: 72m
- Length: 322m

Reservoir
- Total capacity: 17300 thousand cubic meters
- Catchment area: 75 sq. km
- Surface area: 95 hectares

Nunome Dam is a gravity dam located in Nara prefecture in Japan. The dam is used for flood control and water supply. The catchment area of the dam is 75 km^{2}. The dam impounds about 95 ha of land when full and can store 17300 thousand cubic meters of water. The construction of the dam was started in 1975 and completed in 1991.
