= Hongo Tameike Dam =

Dam in Nara Prefecture, Japan

Hongo Tameike
- Interactive map of Hongo Tameike
- Location: Nara Prefecture, Japan
- Coordinates: 34°28′24″N 135°55′16″E
- Opening date: 1935

Dam and spillways
- Height: 23m
- Length: 138m

Reservoir
- Total capacity: 512 thousand cubic meters
- Catchment area: 4.3 sq. km
- Surface area: 4 hectares

Hongo Tameike is an earthen dam located in Nara prefecture in Japan. The dam is used for agriculture. The catchment area of the dam is 4.3 km^{2}. The dam impounds about four ha of land when full and can store 512 thousand cubic meters of water. The construction of the dam was completed in 1935.
