= Takayama Tameike Dam =

Dam in Nara Prefecture, Japan

Takayama Tameike
- Location: Nara Prefecture, Japan
- Opening date: 1956

Dam and spillways
- Height: 23.1m
- Length: 135m

Reservoir
- Total capacity: 580 thousand cubic meters
- Catchment area: 2.3 sq. km
- Surface area: 9 hectares

Takayama Tameike is an earthen dam located in Nara prefecture in Japan. The dam is used for agriculture. The catchment area of the dam is 2.3 km^{2}. The dam impounds about 9 ha of land when full and can store 580 thousand cubic meters of water. The construction of the dam was completed in 1956.
