= Kurahashi Tameike Dam =

Dam in Nara Prefecture, Japan

Kurahashi Tameike
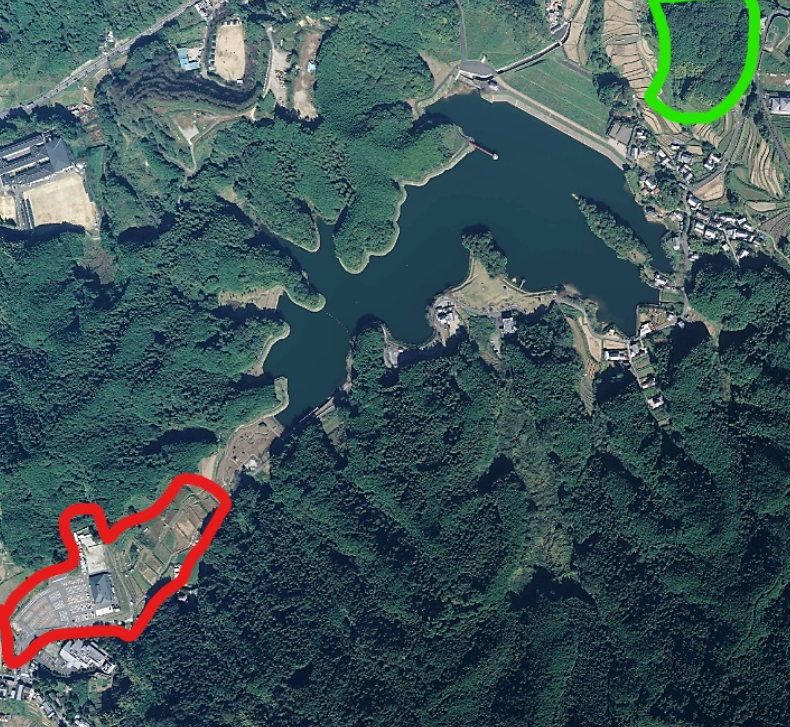
- Location: Nara Prefecture, Japan
- Coordinates: 34°29′59″N 135°52′15″E
- Opening date: 1956

Dam and spillways
- Height: 31m
- Length: 245m

Reservoir
- Total capacity: 1714 thousand cubic meters
- Catchment area: 13.4 sq. km
- Surface area: 19 hectares

Kurahashi Tameike Dam is an earthen dam located in Nara prefecture in Japan. The dam is used for agriculture. The catchment area of the dam is 13.4 km^{2}. The dam impounds about 19 ha of land when full and can store 1714 thousand cubic meters of water. The construction of the dam was started on and completed in 1956.
