= Kose Dam (Nara) =

Dam in Nara Prefecture, Japan

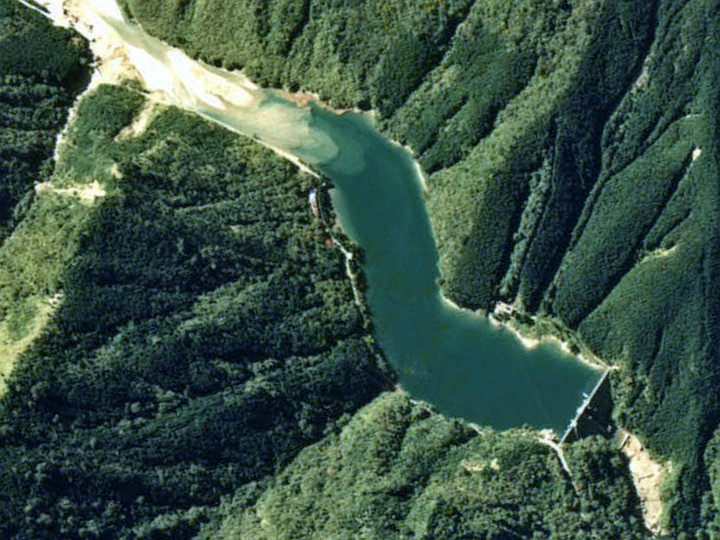
- Interactive map of Kose Dam
- Location: Nara Prefecture, Japan
- Coordinates: 36°11′09″N 135°53′57″E
- Construction began: 1938
- Opening date: 1940

Dam and spillways
- Height: 36.5m
- Length: 111.6m

Reservoir
- Total capacity: 476 thousand cubic meters
- Catchment area: 30.6 sq. km
- Surface area: 8 hectares

Kose Dam is a gravity dam located in Nara prefecture in Japan. The dam is used for power production. The catchment area of the dam is 30.6 km^{2}. The dam impounds about 8 ha of land when full and can store 476 thousand cubic meters of water. The construction of the dam was started in 1938 and completed in 1940.
