= 485 series =

Japanese train type

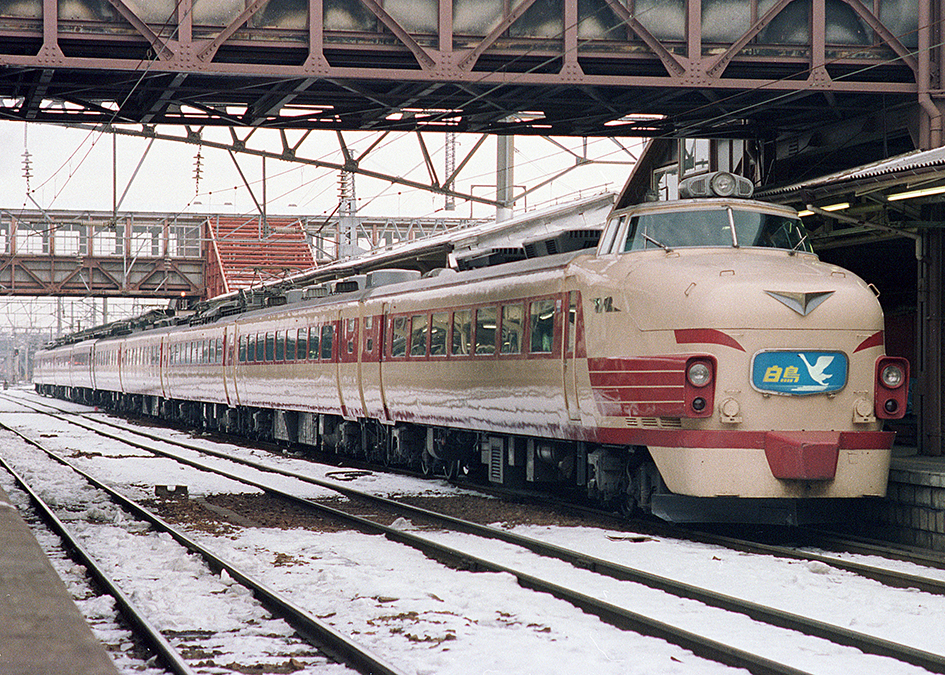
- An original "bonnet-style" 485 series train on a Hakucho service in 1987, at Akita Station
- In service: 1964–2022
- Manufacturers: Hitachi, Kawasaki Heavy Industries, Kinki Sharyo, Kisha Seizo, Nippon Sharyo, Tokyu Car Corporation
- Replaced: KiHa 80 series, KiHa 58 series
- Constructed: 1964–1987
- Entered service: 25 December 1964
- Refurbished: 1999–2006
- Scrapped: 1985 (481 series)
- Number built: 1,453 vehicles
- Number preserved: 6 vehicles and 1 cab end
- Number scrapped: 1,312 vehicles (the rest of 116 vehicles were converted to 183 series)
- Successor: 253 series, 683 series, 651 series, E653 series, E751 series, 787 series, 789 series, 781 series
- Operators: JNR (1964–1987); JR East (1987–2022); JR-West (1987–2011); JR Kyushu (1987–2015)
- Line served: Various

Specifications
- Car body construction: Steel
- Car length: 20 m (65 ft 7 in)
- Maximum speed: 120 km/h (75 mph) (Normal); 130 km/h (81 mph) (Kosei Line); 140 km/h (87 mph) (Tsugaru-Kaikyō Line)
- Traction system: Resistor control
- Electric systems: 1,500 V DC / 20 kV AC (60 Hz) (481 series); 1,500 V DC / 20 kV AC (50 Hz) (483 series); 1,500 V DC / 20 kV AC (50/60 Hz) (485 series)
- Current collection: overhead catenary
- Bogies: DT32, TR69
- Braking systems: Dynamic brake, electro-pneumatic brake
- Safety systems: ATS-S, ATS-P, ATC (485-3000 series only), Tobu ATS (Nikkō set only)
- Track gauge: 1,067 mm (3 ft 6 in)

The 485 series (485系, 485-kei) (and the earlier 481 and 483 series variants) was a Japanese limited express electric multiple unit (EMU) type introduced in 1964 by Japanese National Railways (JNR), and later operated by the East Japan Railway Company (JR East), West Japan Railway Company (JR-West), and Kyushu Railway Company (JR Kyushu). Approximately 1,500 vehicles were built, although by April 2016, JR East was the only operator still using this type. The last 485 series train was pulled from service on December 11, 2022, when the Resort Yamadori Joyful Train set was retired.

== Variants ==
- 481 series: Dual-voltage (1,500 V DC / 20 kV AC (60 Hz), introduced 1964
- 483 series: Dual-voltage (1,500 V DC / 20 kV AC (50 Hz), introduced 1965
- 485 series: Dual-voltage (1,500 V DC / 20 kV AC (50/60 Hz), introduced 1968

== 481 series ==
The 481 series trains were introduced in 1964 for use on Hokuriku Line limited services, and were capable of operating under 1,500 V DC or 20 kV AC (60 Hz) overhead wire power supplies. These train were subsequently operated by JR-West and JR Kyushu.

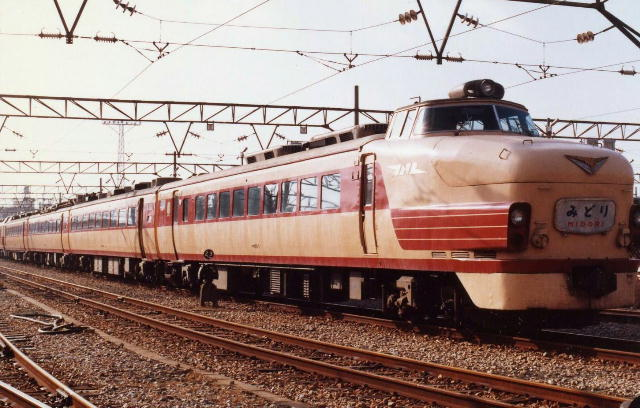
A 481 series trainset on a Midori service circa 1982

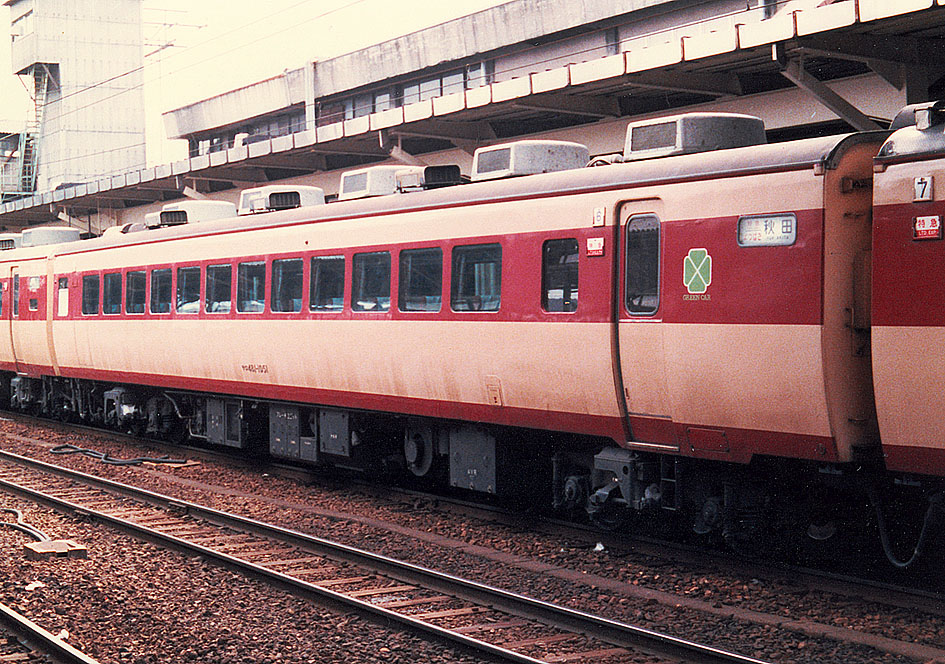
481 series Green car SaRo 481–1051 in 1985

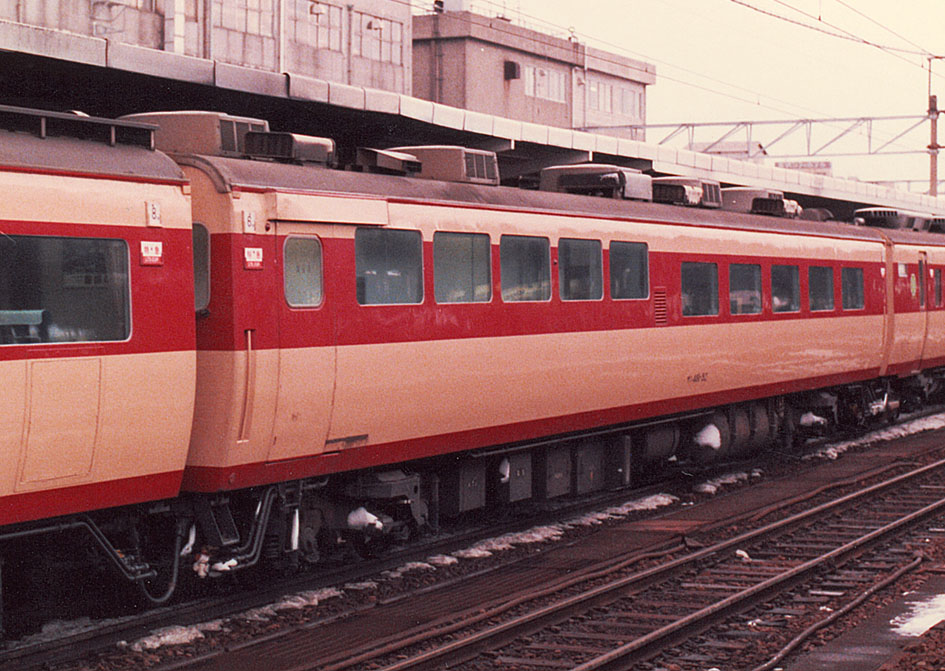
481 series restaurant car SaShi 481–52 in 1985

=== Interior ===
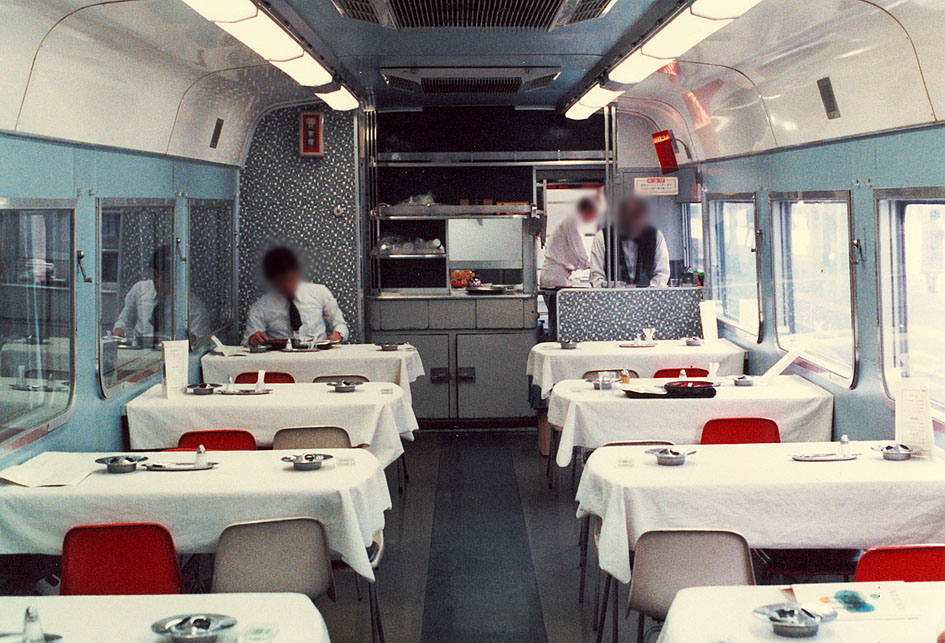
Interior of SaShi 481-40 restaurant car in 1985

== 483 series ==
The 483 series trains were introduced in 1965 for use on Tohoku Main Line limited express services, and were capable of operating under 1,500 V DC or 20 kV AC (50 Hz) overhead wire power supplies. The non-powered trailer cars used in these sets were classified 481 series.

== 485 series ==
=== Variants ===
- 485 series (original) (from 1968)
- 485–200 series (from 1972)
- 485–300 series (from 1974)
- 485–1000 series (from 1975)
- 485–1500 series (from 1974)
- 485–3000 series (converted from former 485–1000 series trains between 1996 and 2001)
- Joyful Train variants

The 485 series trains were introduced in 1968. These trains were capable of operating under 1,500 V DC or 20 kV AC (50/60 Hz) overhead wire power supplies. The original design was closely based on the bonnet-style 181 series EMU, with the primary difference being ceilings that were 12.5 cm (4.9 in) higher. However, trains produced from 1972 onwards, starting with the 485–200 series, featured a new design with a cab adapted from the 583 series sleeper expresses, which became the standard on nearly all subsequent JNR limited-express EMUs. The 485–200 series trains had gangway doors at the cab ends to allow trains to be operated in multiple, but the 485–300 series trains introduced from 1974 had no gangways. The 485–1500 series trains were built in 1974 for use in Hokkaido. The 485–1000 series trains built from 1975 onward incorporated design improvements from the DC-only 183-1000 series trains.

=== Operations ===
485 series trains were also used on the Raichō and Super Raichō services from 1968 until the service ended in March 2011. These trains sometimes utilized a panoramic cab car (numbered KuRo 481–2000) which was a "Green Car".

The Inaho and Hokuetsu services have used 485 and 485–3000 series trains since 1969.

The Hitachi service used 485 series trainsets from 1969 to 1998, when it was replaced by Super Hitachi and Fresh Hitachi services.

The Tsugaru service has used 485–3000 series trains since 2002, when the service started.

The Nikkō service used a dedicated 6-car 485 series set from March 2006 until 4 June 2011, which was occasionally substituted by a reserve 189 series set nicknamed Ayano. It was replaced by two 6-car 253 series sets from 4 June 2011.

The Noto has used a single 6-car 485 series train since March 2010, replacing the previous 489 series train.

Currently owned by JR East and formerly by JR-West and JR Kyushu, they also operated in the JR Hokkaido area on regular Hakuchō services, and in JR Central and JR Shikoku areas providing extra services. The last original JNR-style trainset (Sendai-based set A1+A2) operated by JR East was withdrawn in June 2016 after a series of special farewell Hibari, Aizu, and Tsubasa runs on 18 and 19 June.

==== Limited express ====
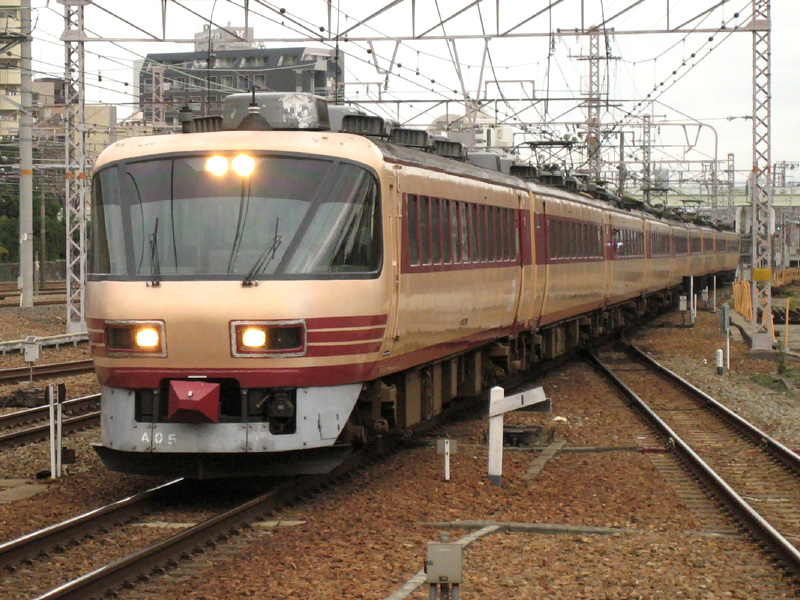
A 485 series train with panoramic cab car (KuRo 481–2000) on a Raichō service in December 2006

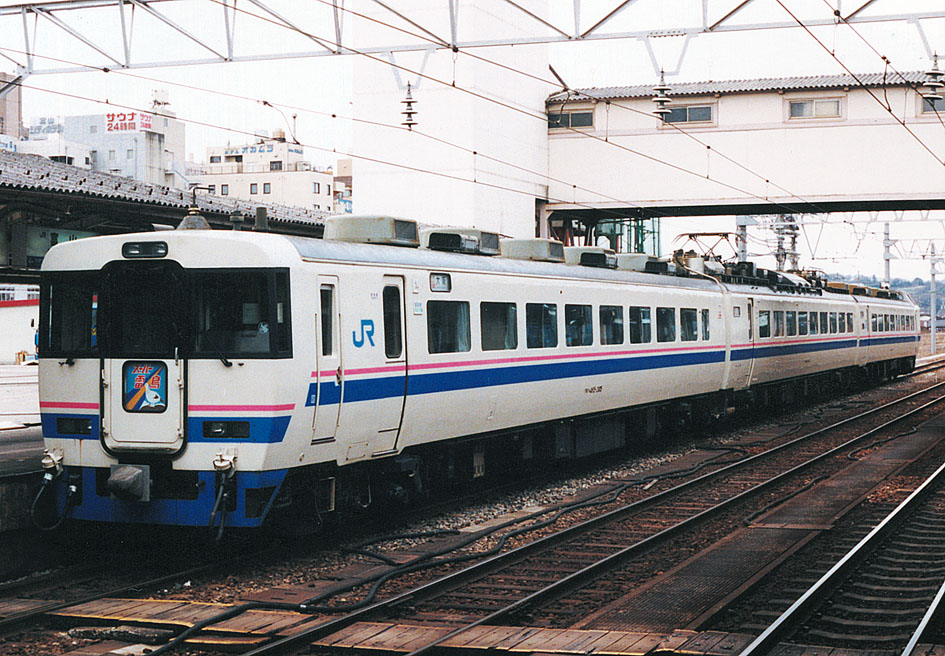
A JR-West Super Raichō KuMoHa 485-200 coach

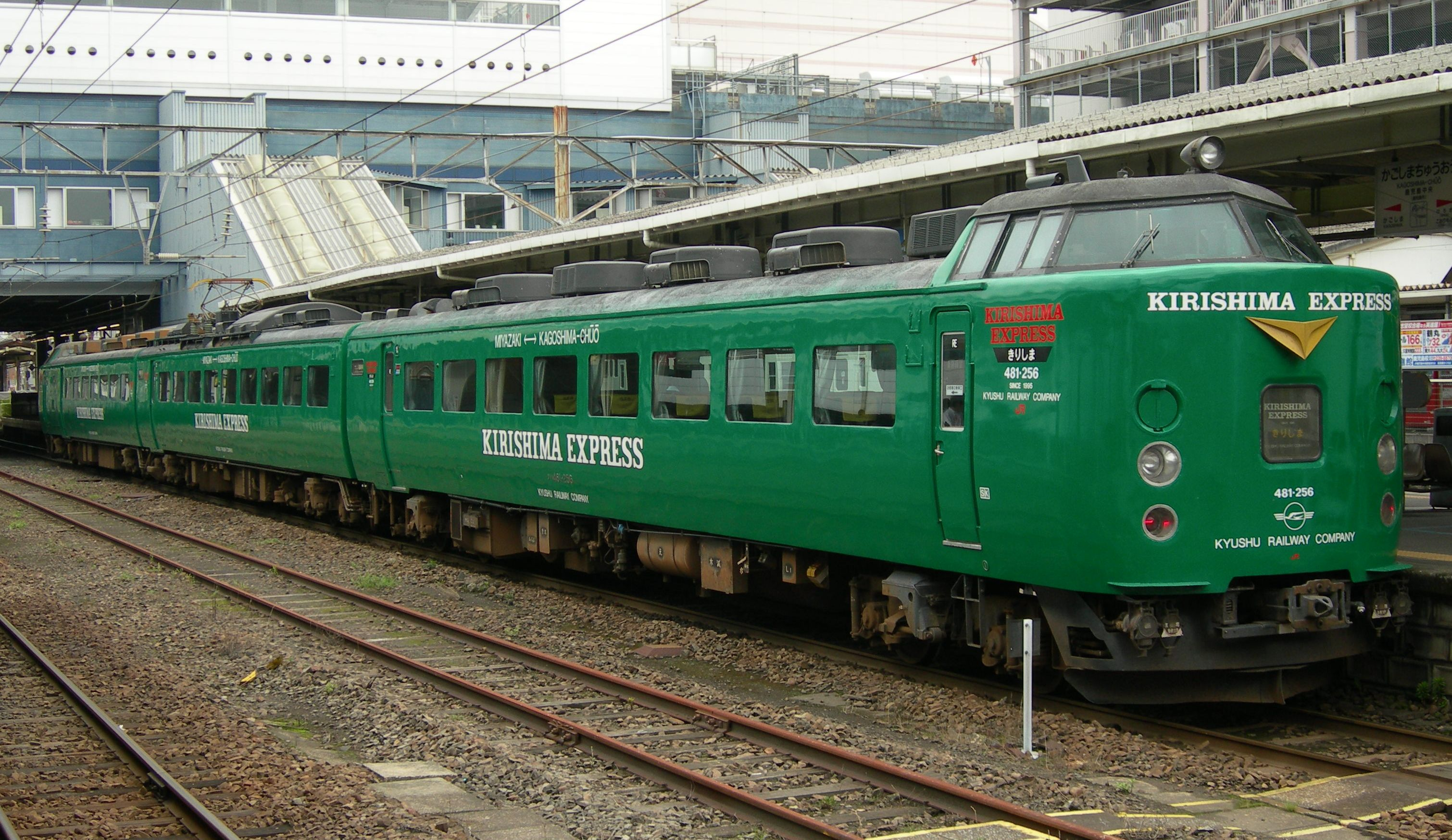
A JR Kyushu 485–200 series on a Kirishima service in July 2009

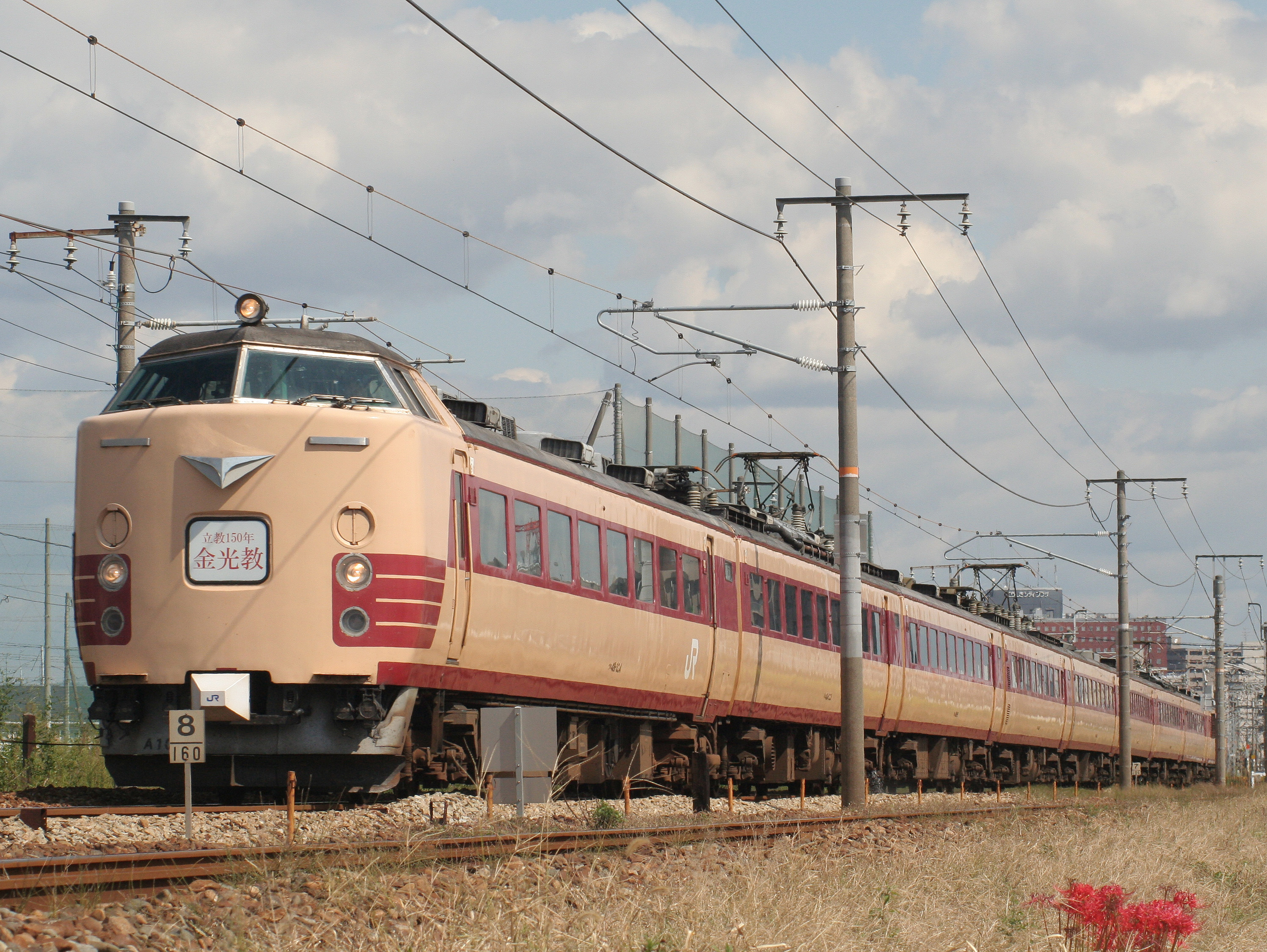
A JR-West 485–300 series in October 2009

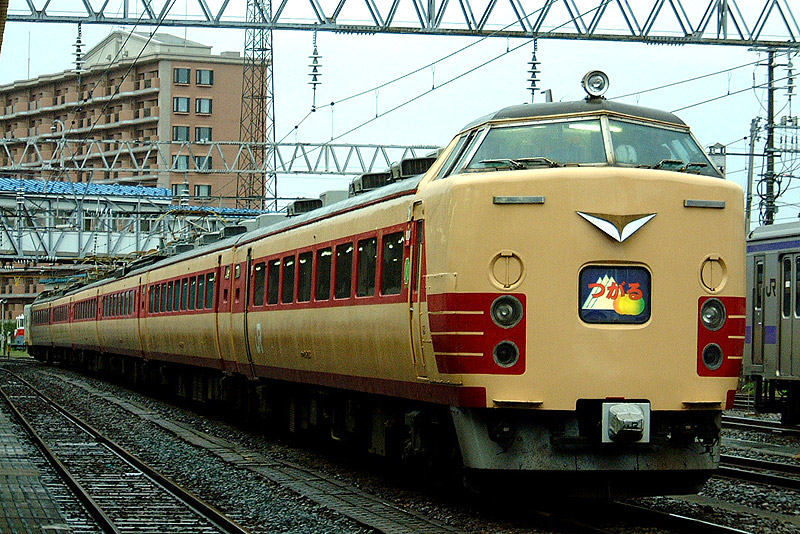
A 485–1000 series set in August 2003

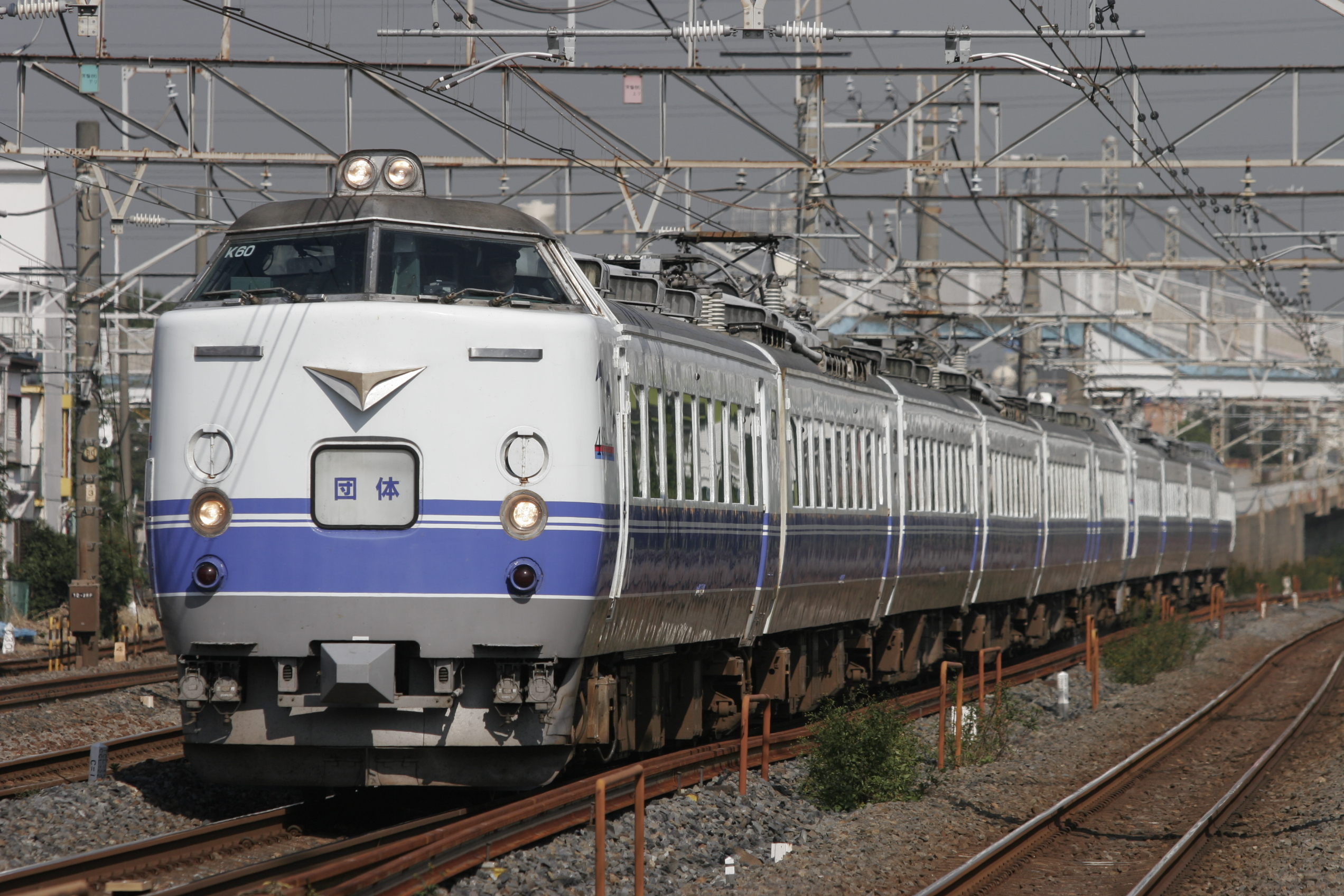
A JR East 485–1500 series in November 2007

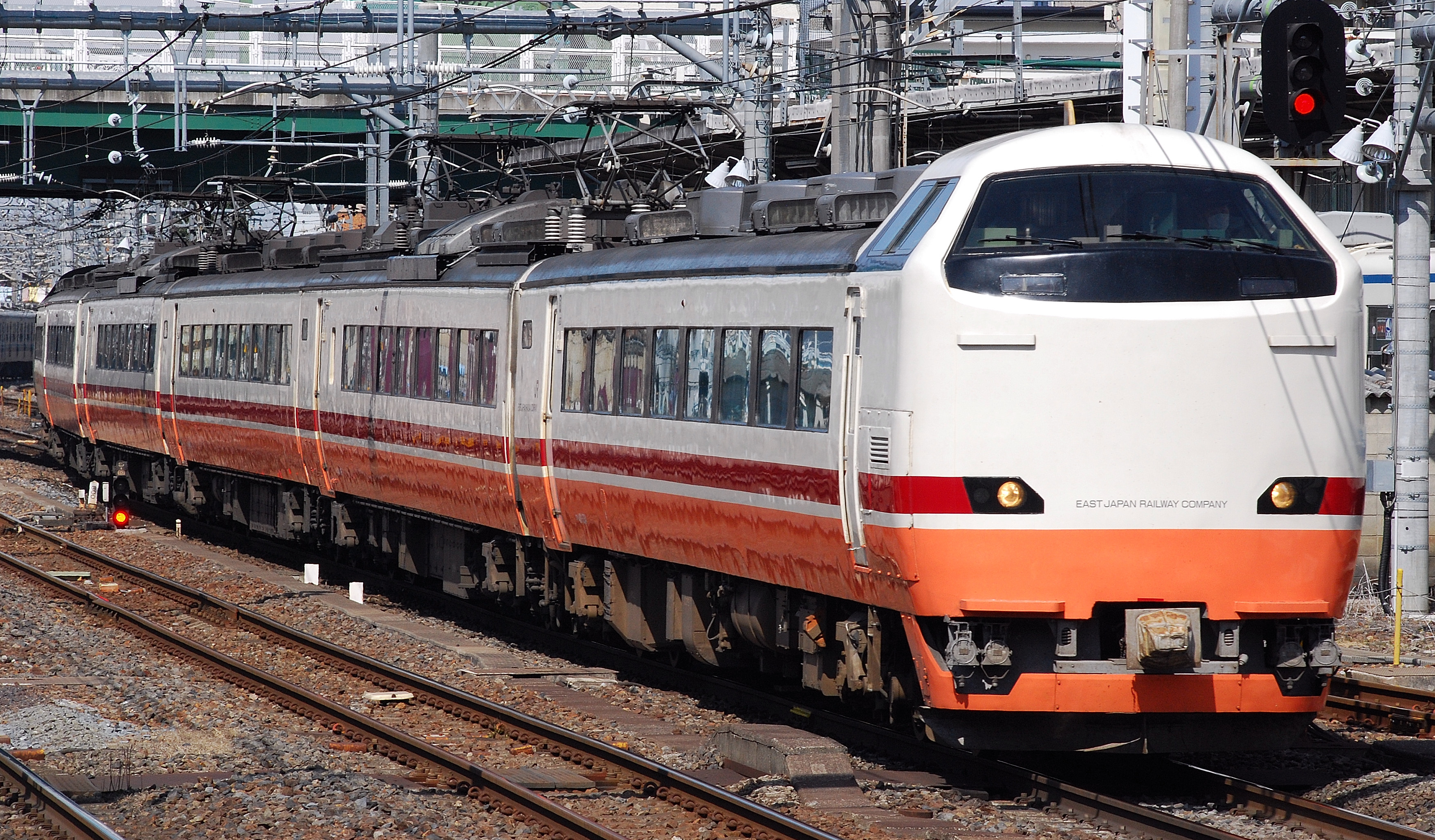
A 485 series train on Nikkō service in May 2011

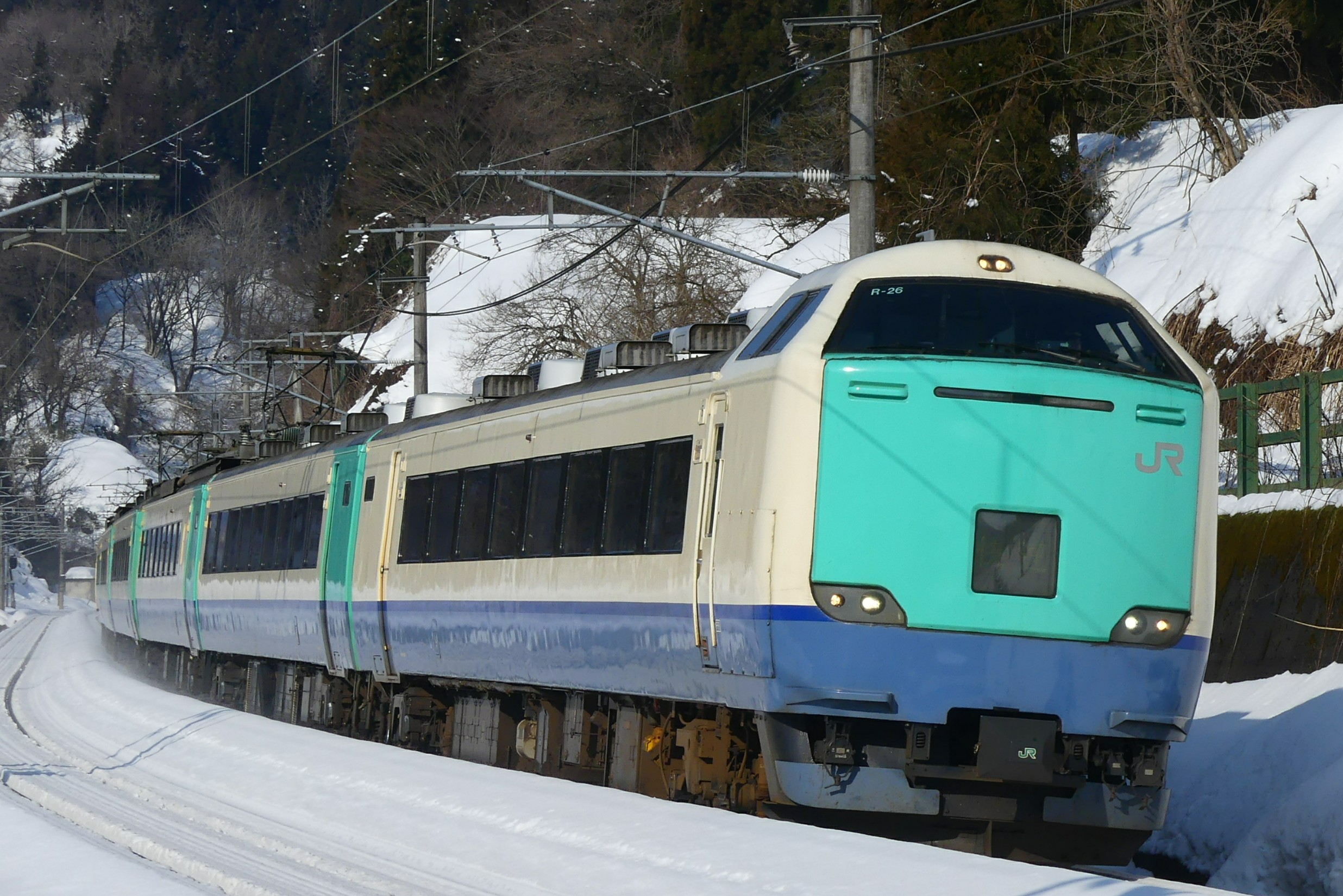
A Niigata-based 485–3000 series refurbished train on a Rapid service in September 2018

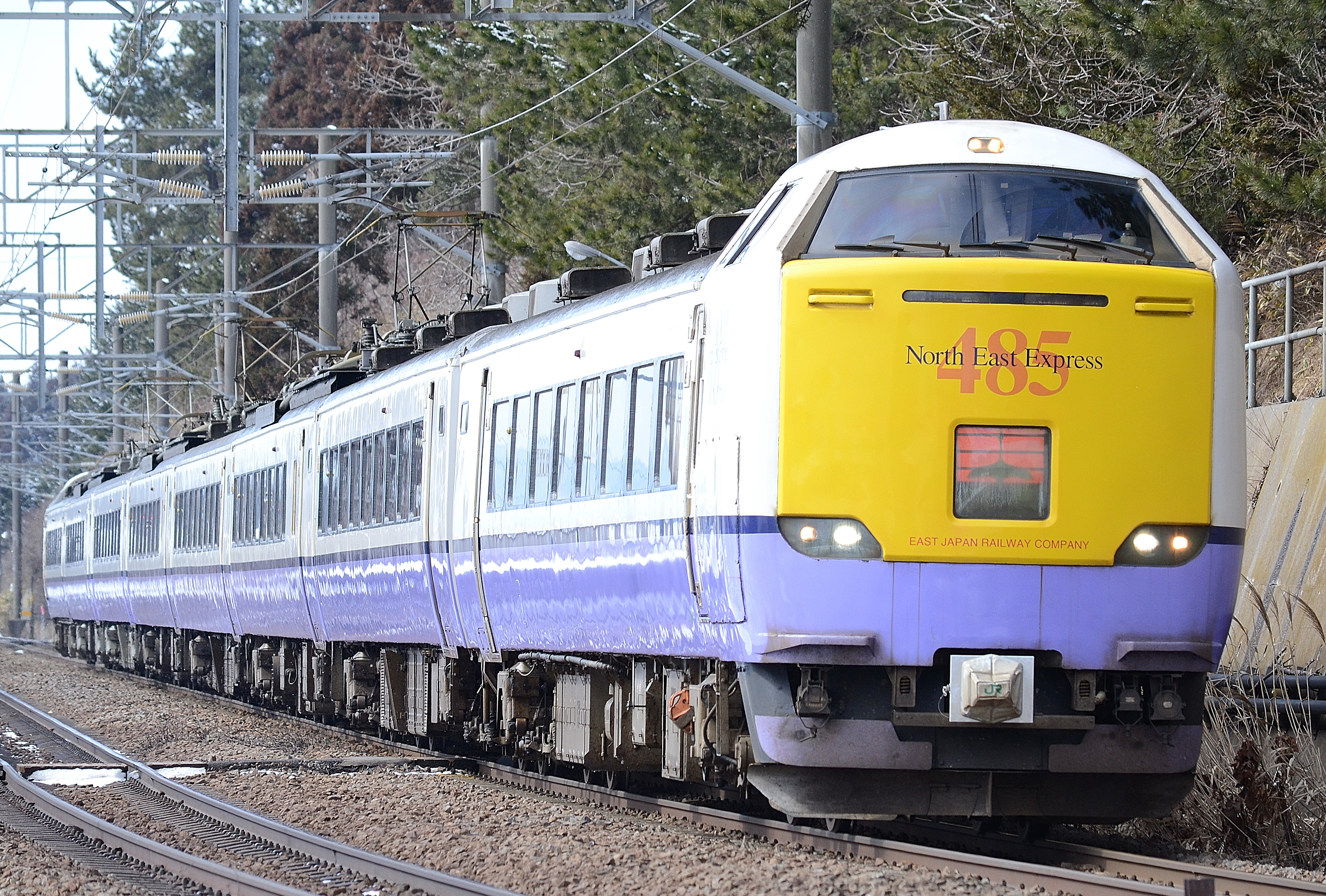
An Aomori-based 485–3000 series refurbished train on a Hakucho service in March 2016

==== Joyful Train sets ====
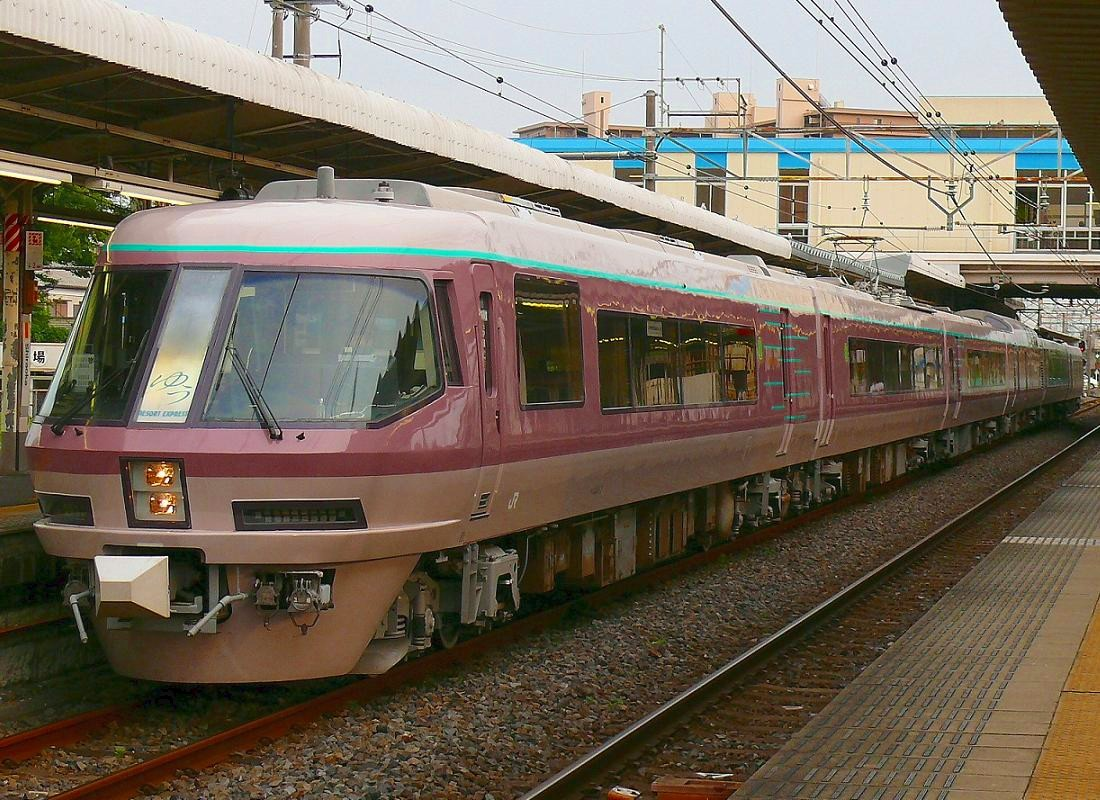
Resort Express Yū, May 2006

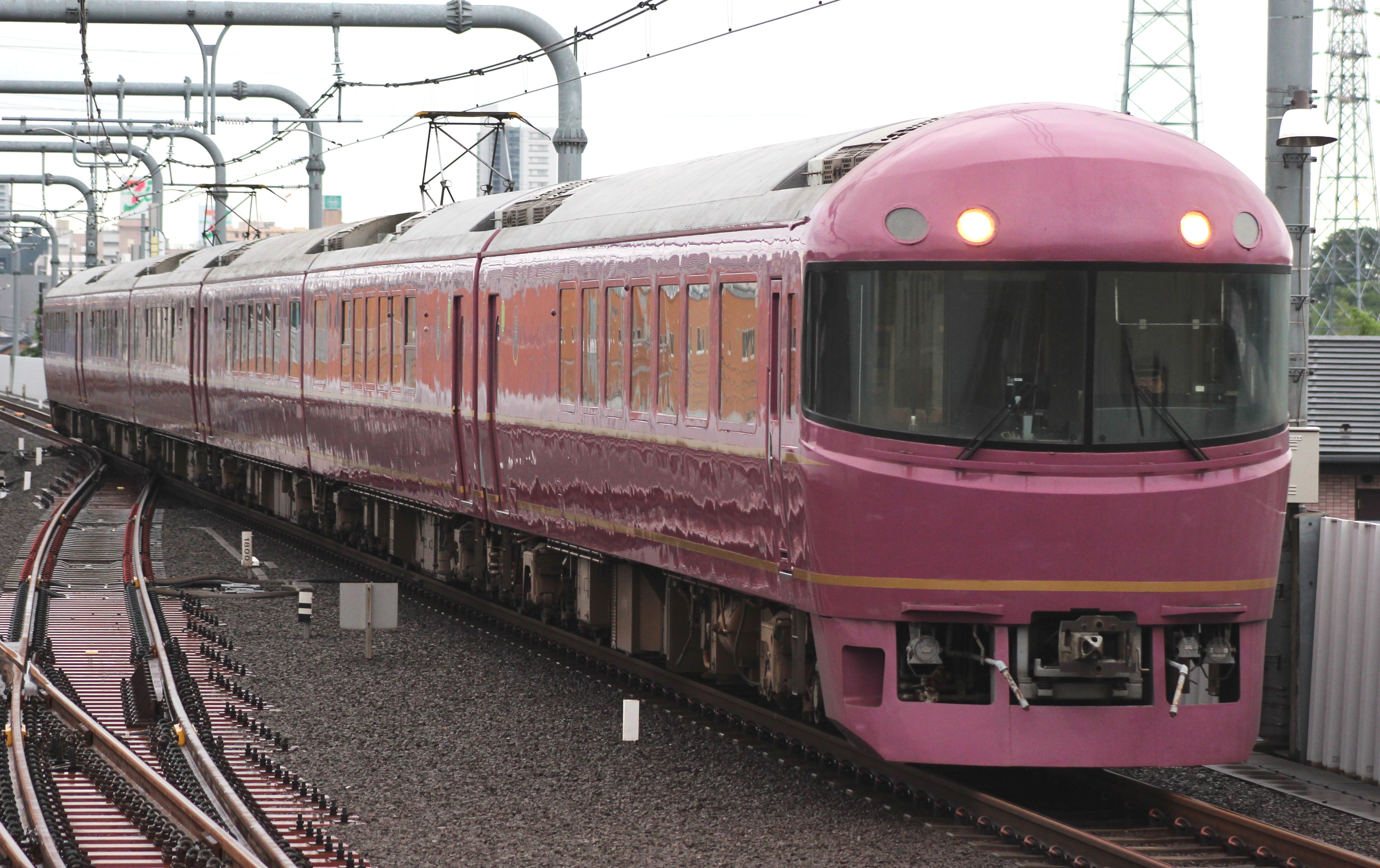
Utage, June 2013

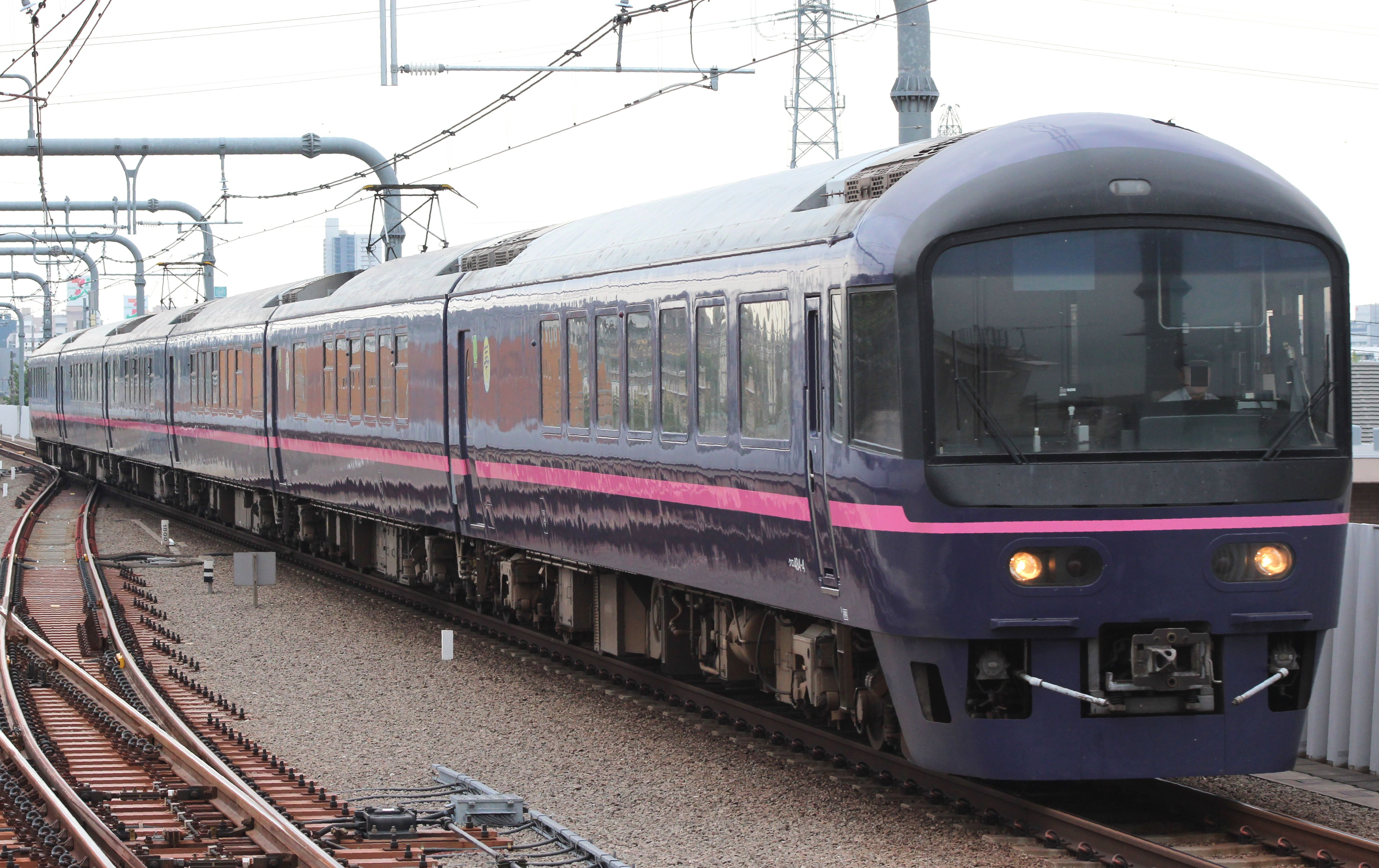
Hana, June 2013

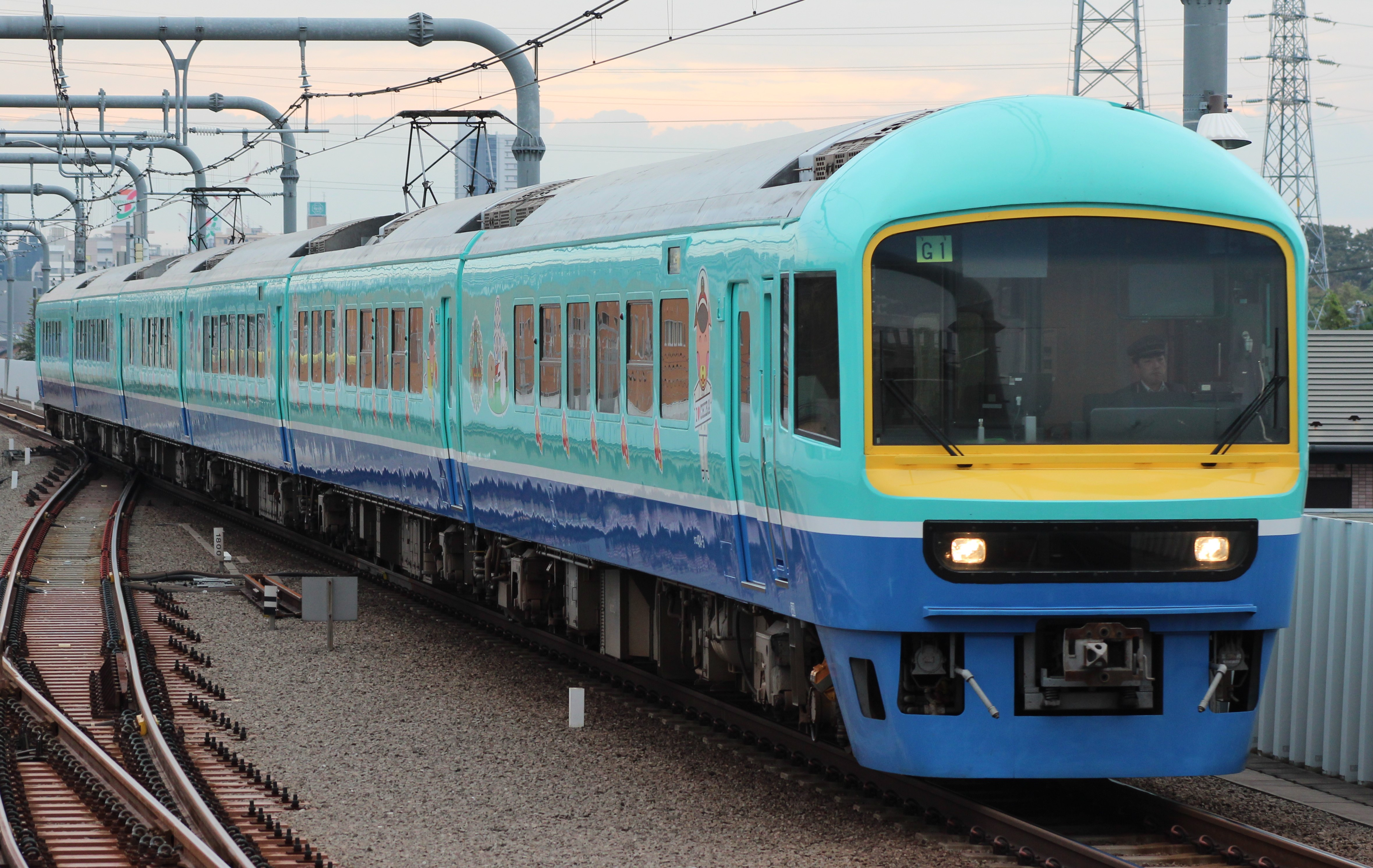
New Nanohana, October 2013

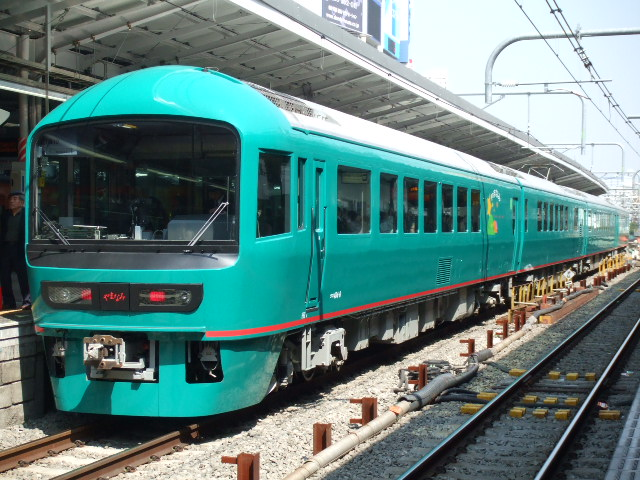
Yamanami, April 2007

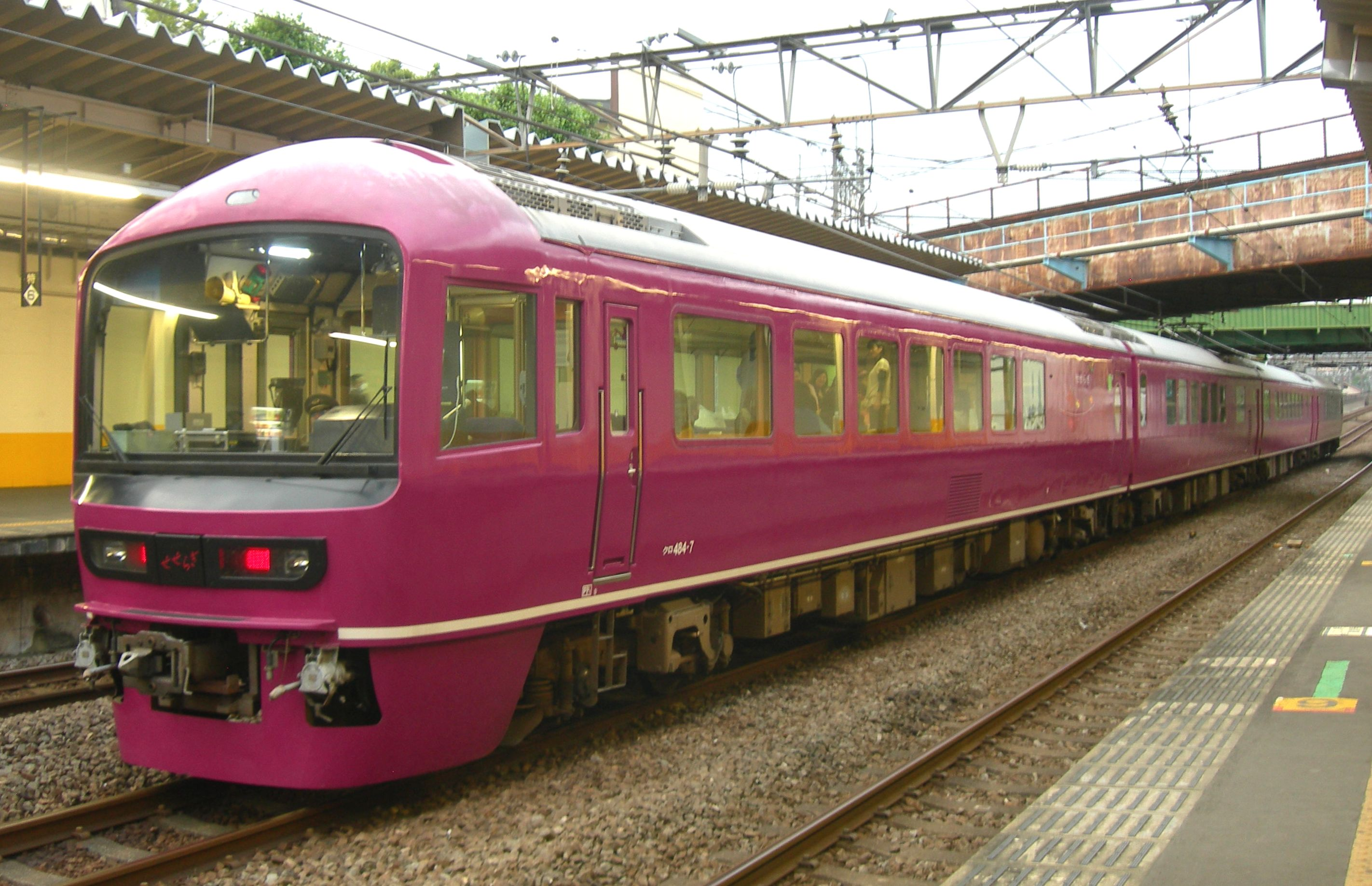
Seseragi, May 2009

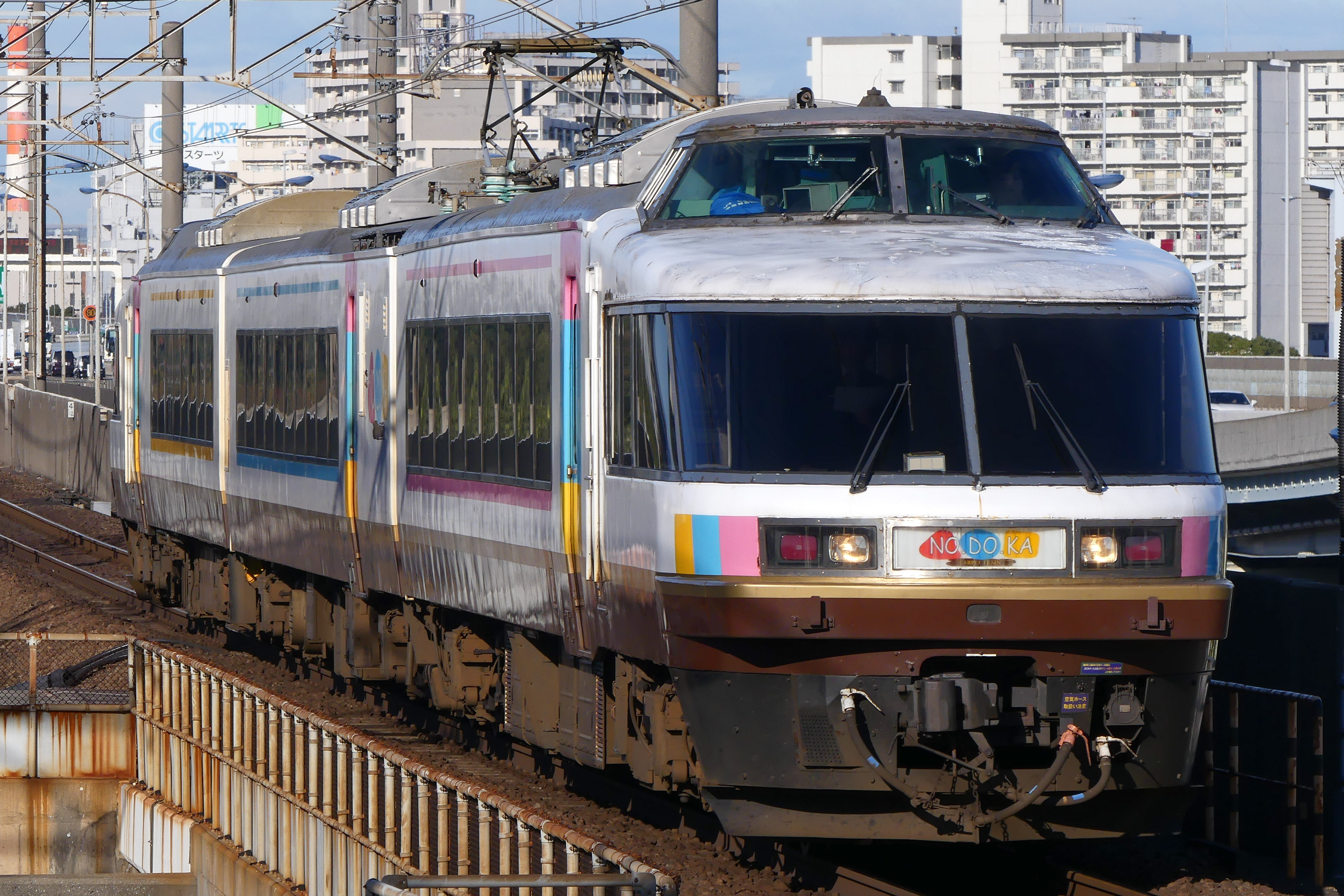
No.Do.Ka, December 2016

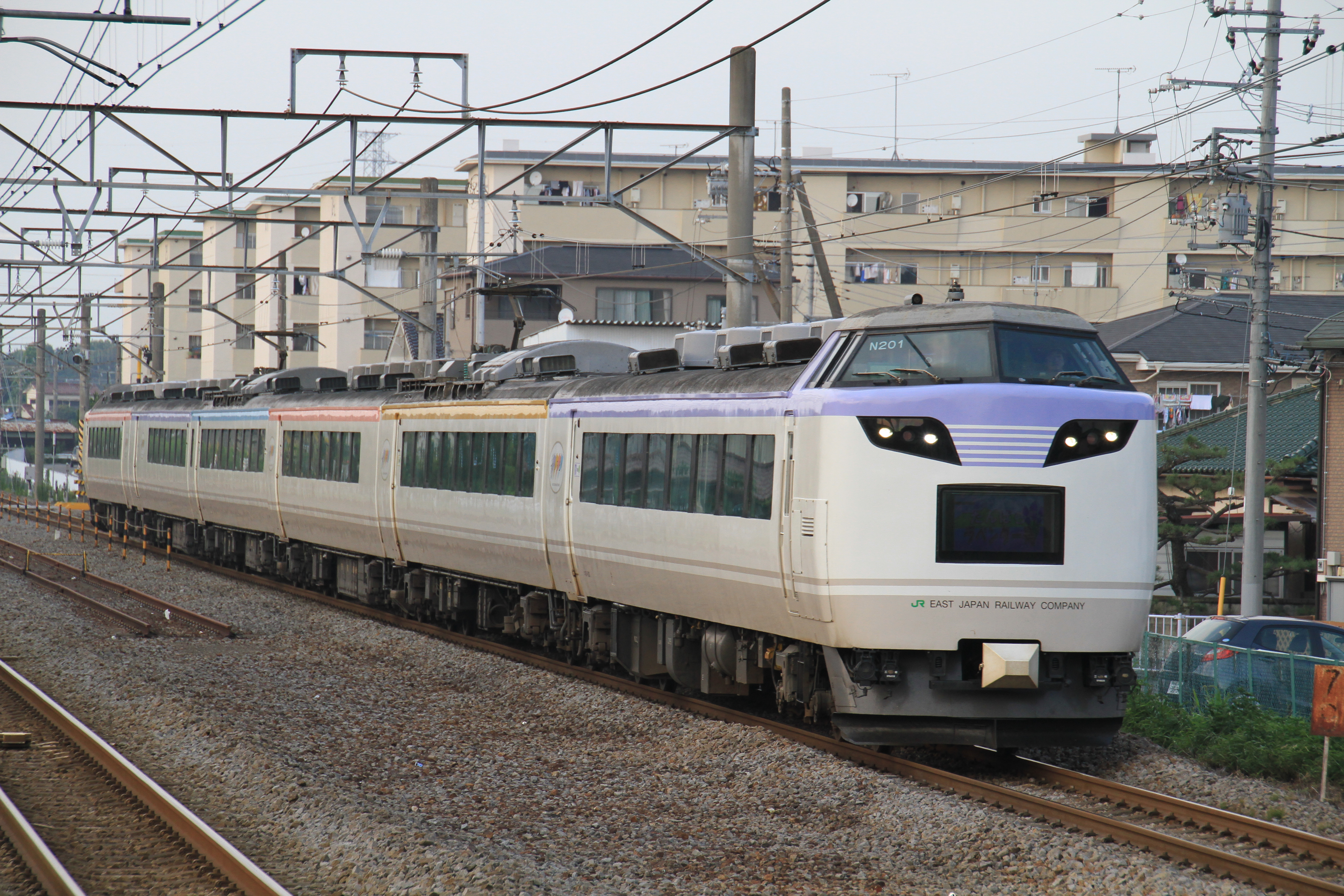
Irodori, July 2010

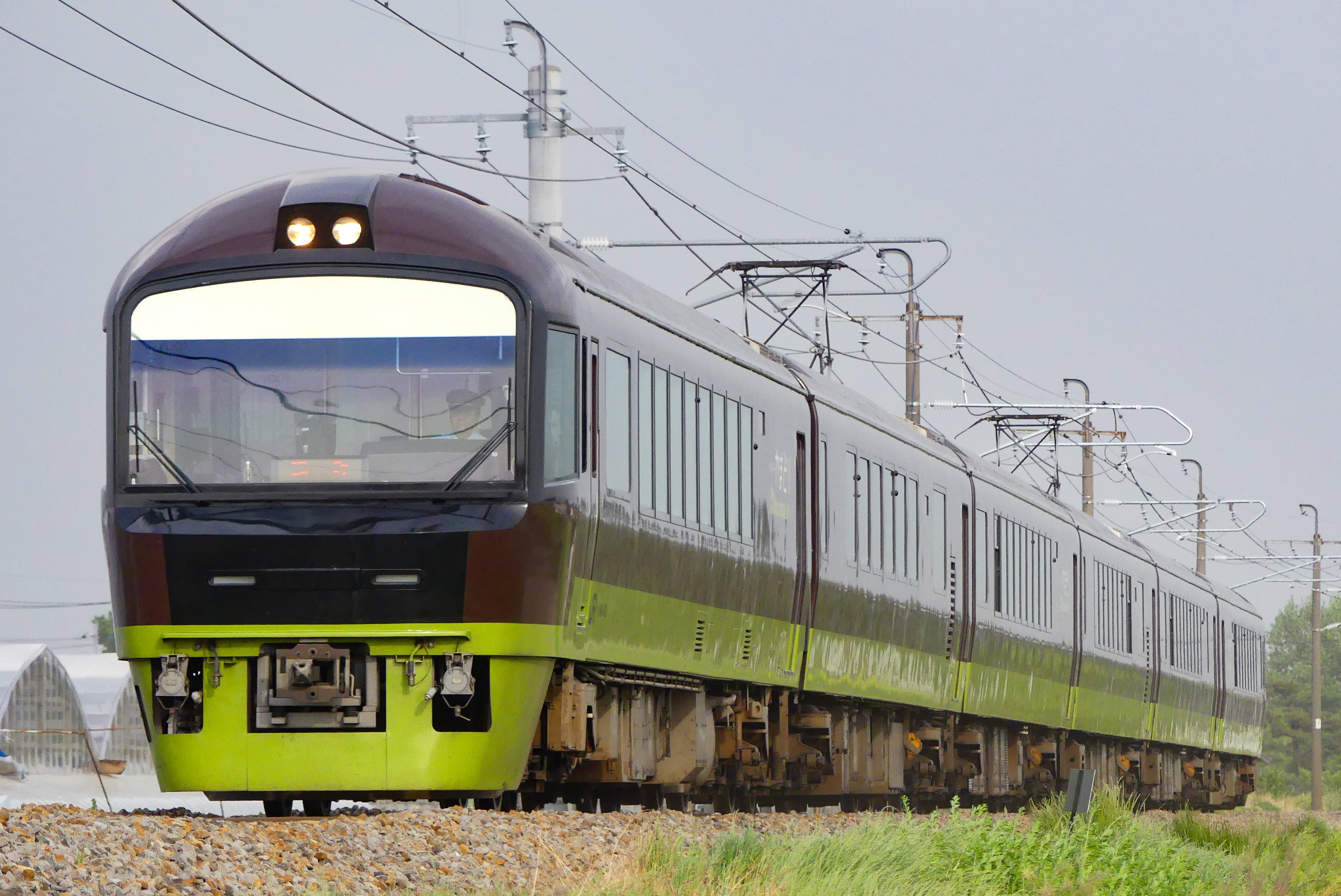
Resort Yamadori, May 2017

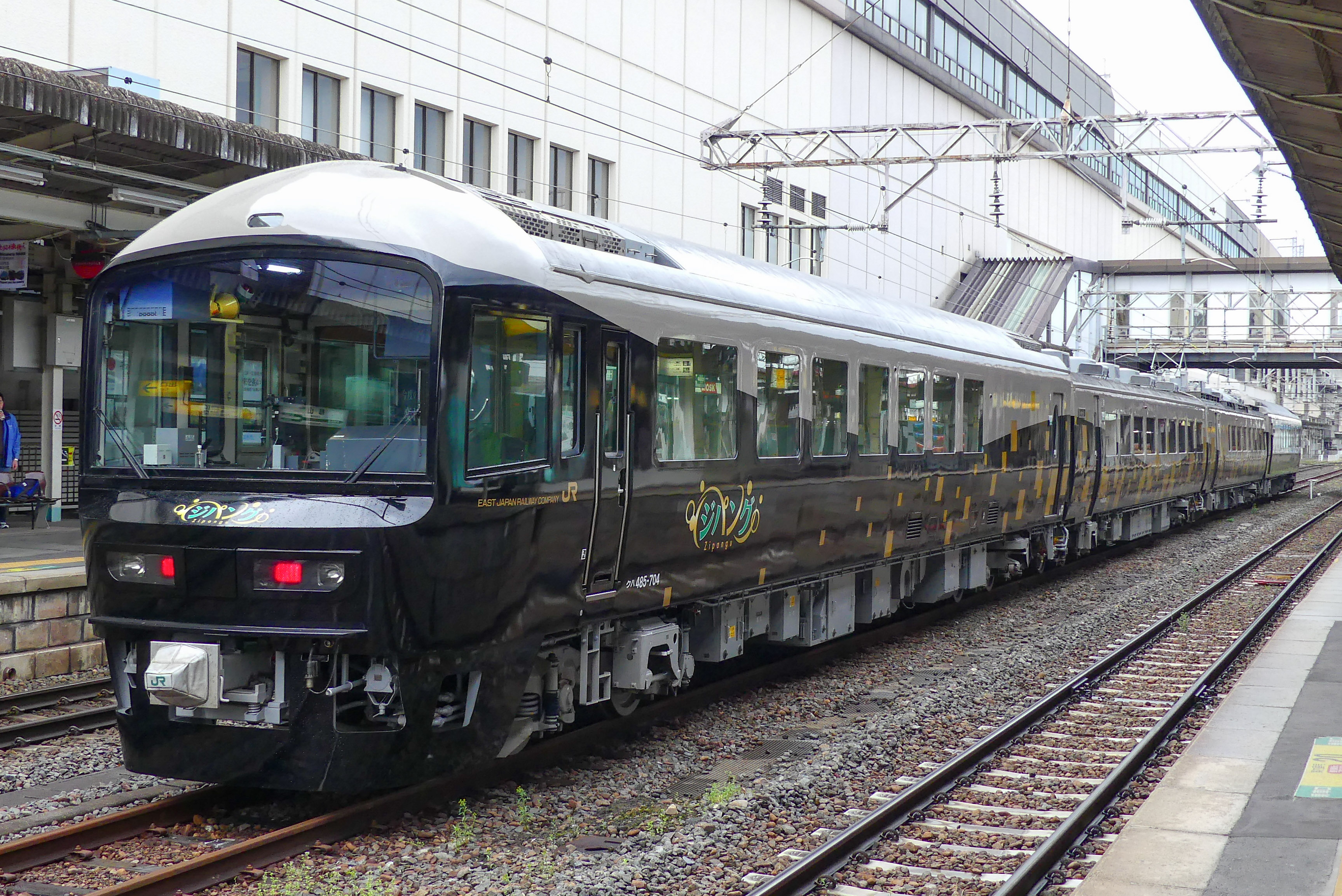
Zipangu, April 2017

=== Formations ===
==== 485-3000 series ====
As of 1 April 2016, only two 485–3000 series refurbished sets remain in service, based at Niigata Depot for use on limited-stop "Rapid" services between Niigata and Itoigawa on the Nihonkai Hisui Line. These sets were withdrawn in 2017, and from 2017 to 2022 only Joyful Train sets remain in service. The six-car sets are formed as follows, with car 1 at the Itoigawa end. The last 485–3000 series-operated rapid trains were discontinued.

Car No.	1	2	3	4	5	6
Designation	Thsc'	M'	M	M'	M	Tc
Numbering	KuRoHa 481-30xx	MoHa 484-30xx	MoHa 485-30xx	MoHa 484-30xx	MoHa 485-30xx	KuHa 481-30xx

- Car 1 includes "Green car" (first class) seating.
- Cars 2 and 4 each have two pantographs.

== Preserved examples ==
As of October 2016, five 485 series cars are preserved, as follows.

- KuHa 481 26: Preserved at the Railway Museum in Saitama, Saitama.
- KuHa 481 246: Preserved at the Kyushu Railway History Museum in Kitakyushu. (front end section only)
- KuHa 481 256: Preserved at the JR Kyushu Kokura Depot in Kitakyushu since October 2016.
- KuHa 481 603: Preserved at the Kyushu Railway History Museum in Kitakyushu.
- MoHa 484 61: Preserved at the Railway Museum in Saitama, Saitama.
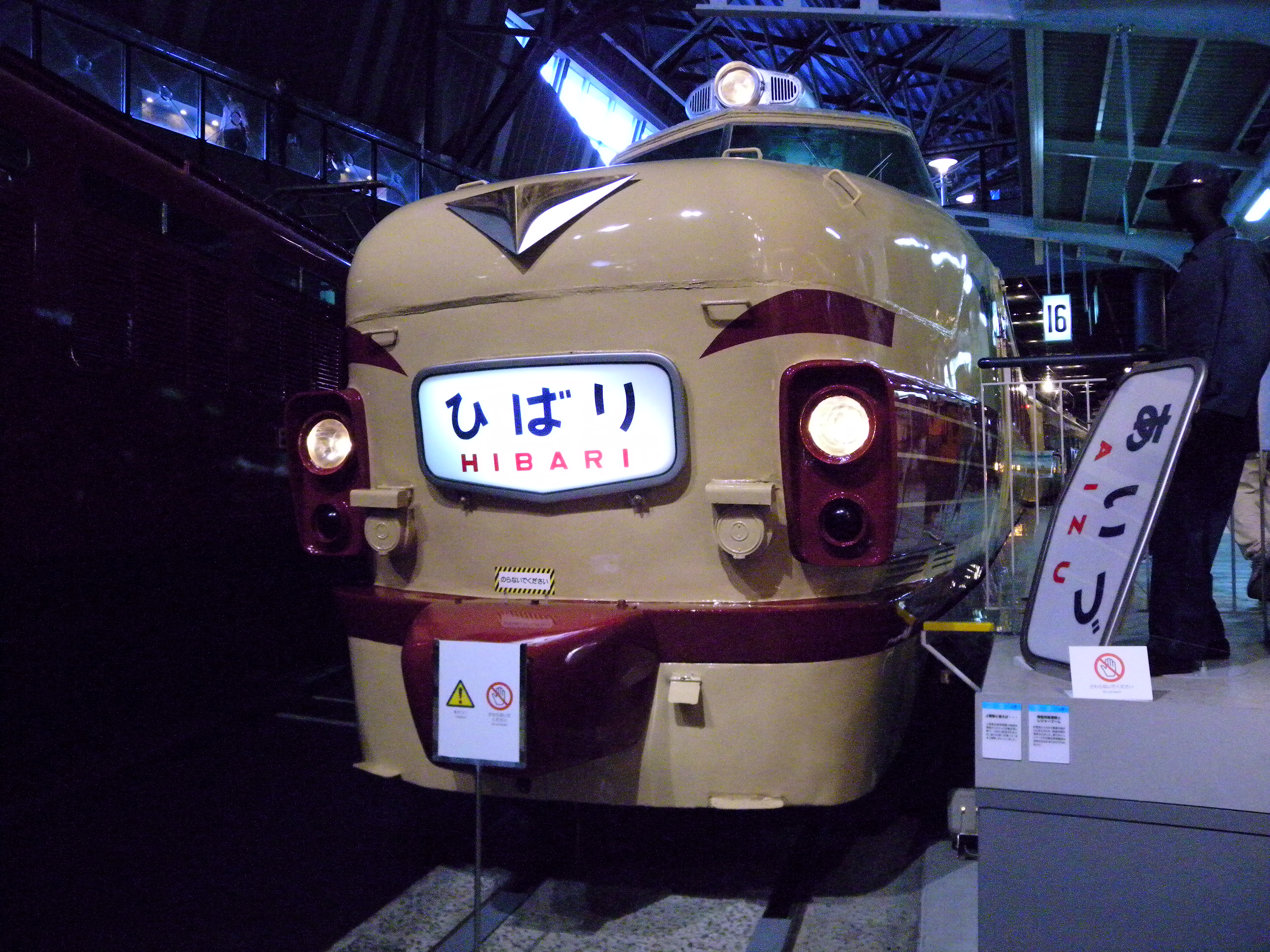
KuHa 481 26 preserved at the Railway Museum in Saitama

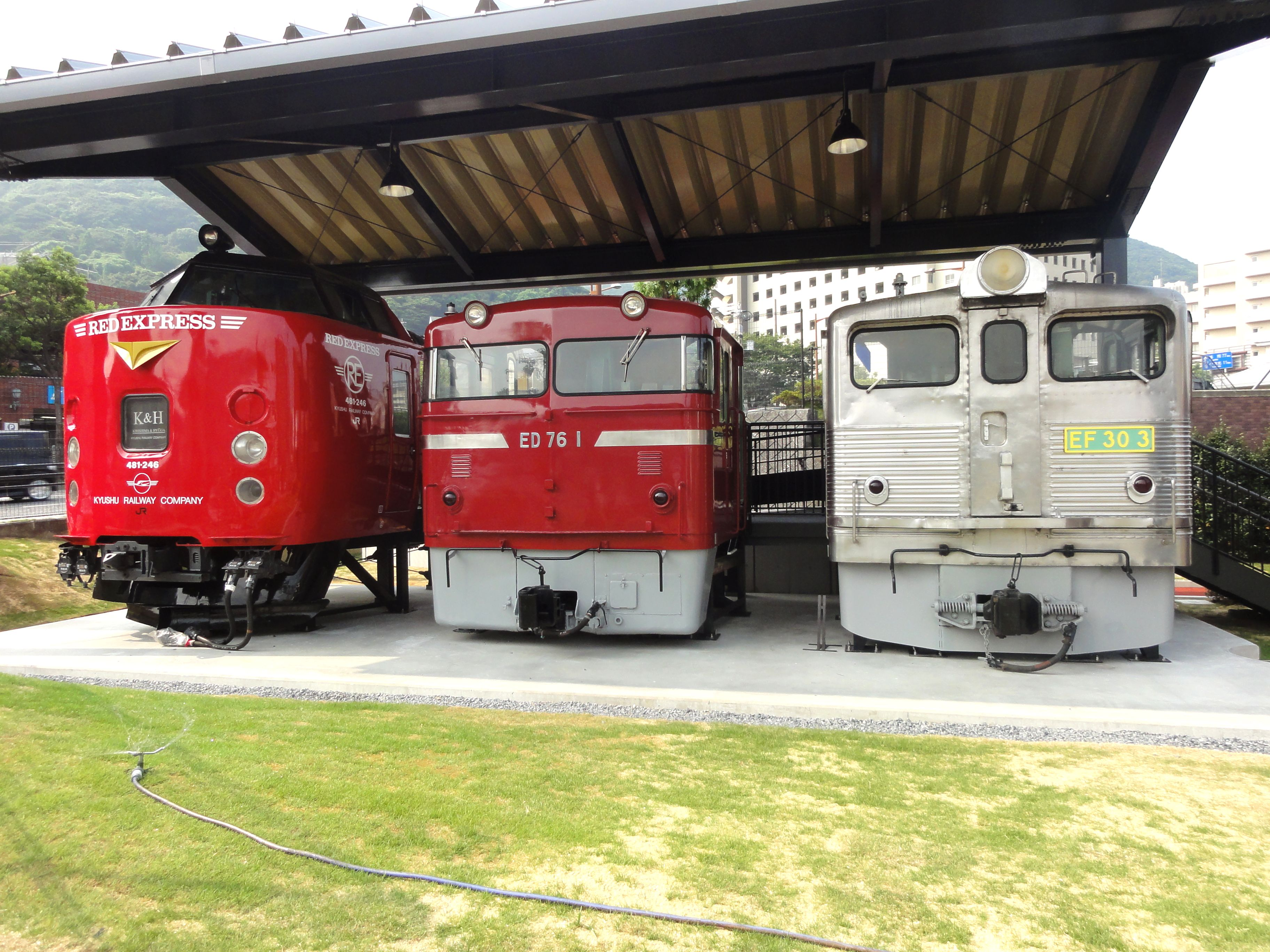
The cab end of KuHa 481 246 (left) preserved at the Kyushu Railway History Museum in Kitakyushu

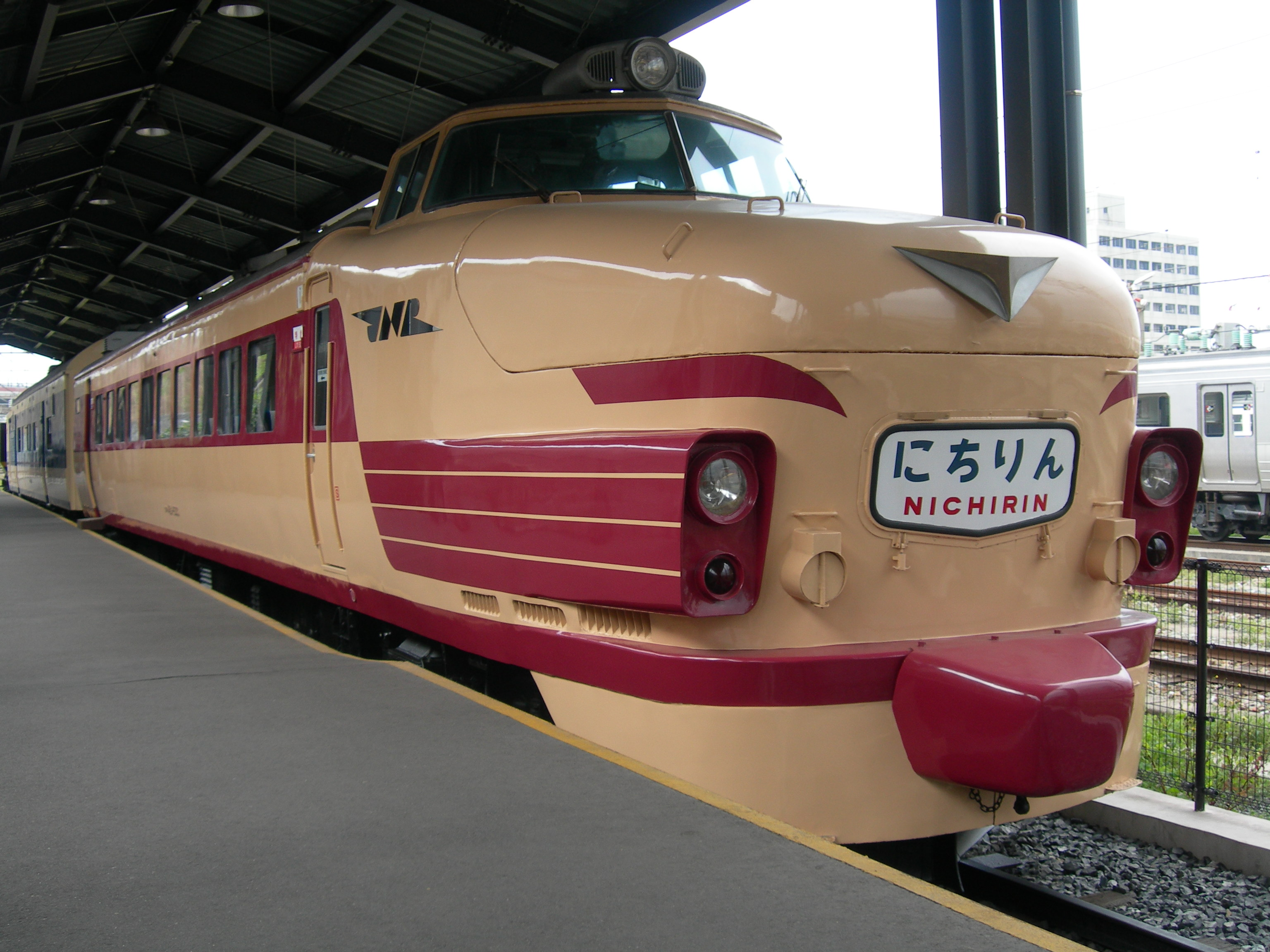
KuHa 481 603 preserved at the Kyushu Railway History Museum in Kitakyushu

== See also ==
- 489 series
