= 157 series =

Japanese DC electric multiple unit train type

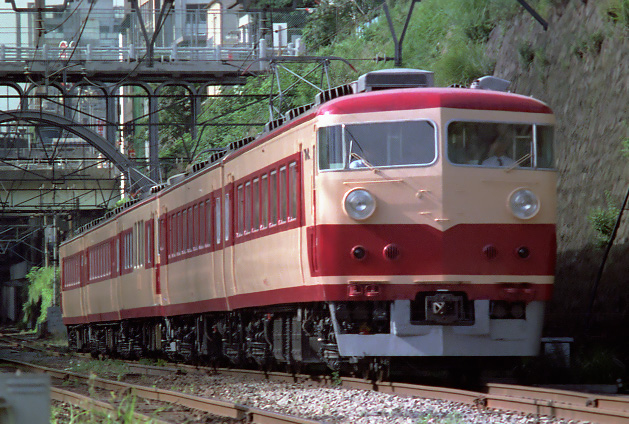
- A 157 series EMU on an imperial train working, June 1978
- In service: September 1959–1980
- Manufacturers: Kawasaki Sharyo, Kisha Seizo, Nippon Sharyo
- Constructed: 1959–1963
- Number built: 32 vehicles
- Number in service: None
- Number preserved: 1 vehicle
- Number scrapped: 31 vehicles
- Operator: JNR
- Depot: Tamachi

Specifications
- Car body construction: Steel
- Traction system: Resistor control
- Traction motors: MT46
- Power output: 100kW
- Transmission: Gear Ratio: 1:4.21 (19:80)
- Electric system: 1,500 V DC
- Current collection: Overhead wire
- Track gauge: 1,067 mm (3 ft 6 in)

The 157 series (157系) was a Japanese DC electric multiple unit (EMU) train type operated on limited express services by Japanese National Railways (JNR) from 1959 until 1980.

== Operations ==
The 157 series EMUs were first introduced by JNR on Nikkō semi express services between Tokyo and Nikkō on 22 September 1959 to counter competition from the private company Tobu Railway, which also operated trains to Nikkō. They were also used on Chusenji services between Shinjuku and Nikkō, and Nasuno services between Ueno and Kuroiso.

157 series EMUs were also introduced on seasonal Hibiki services on the Tokaido Main Line from 21 November 1959, and were later used on Amagi and Soyokaze services.

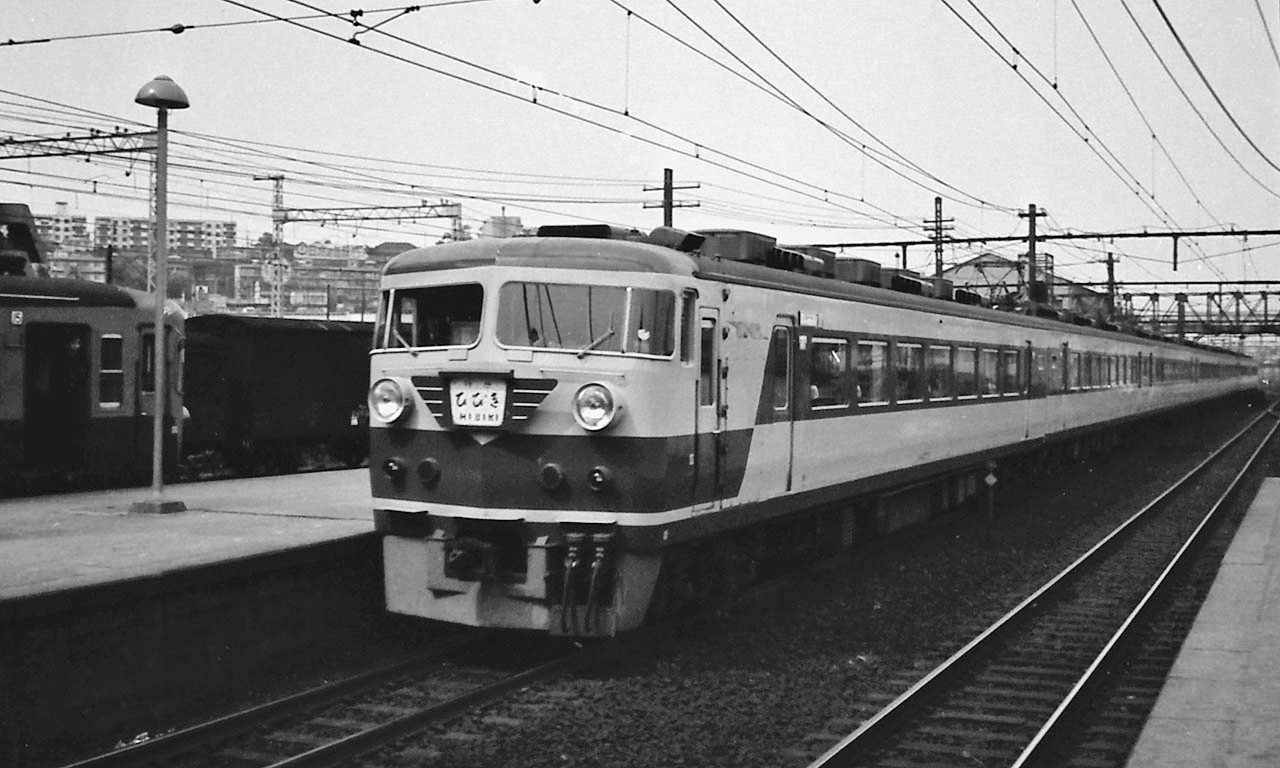
A 157 series set on a Hibiki limited express service in the 1970s

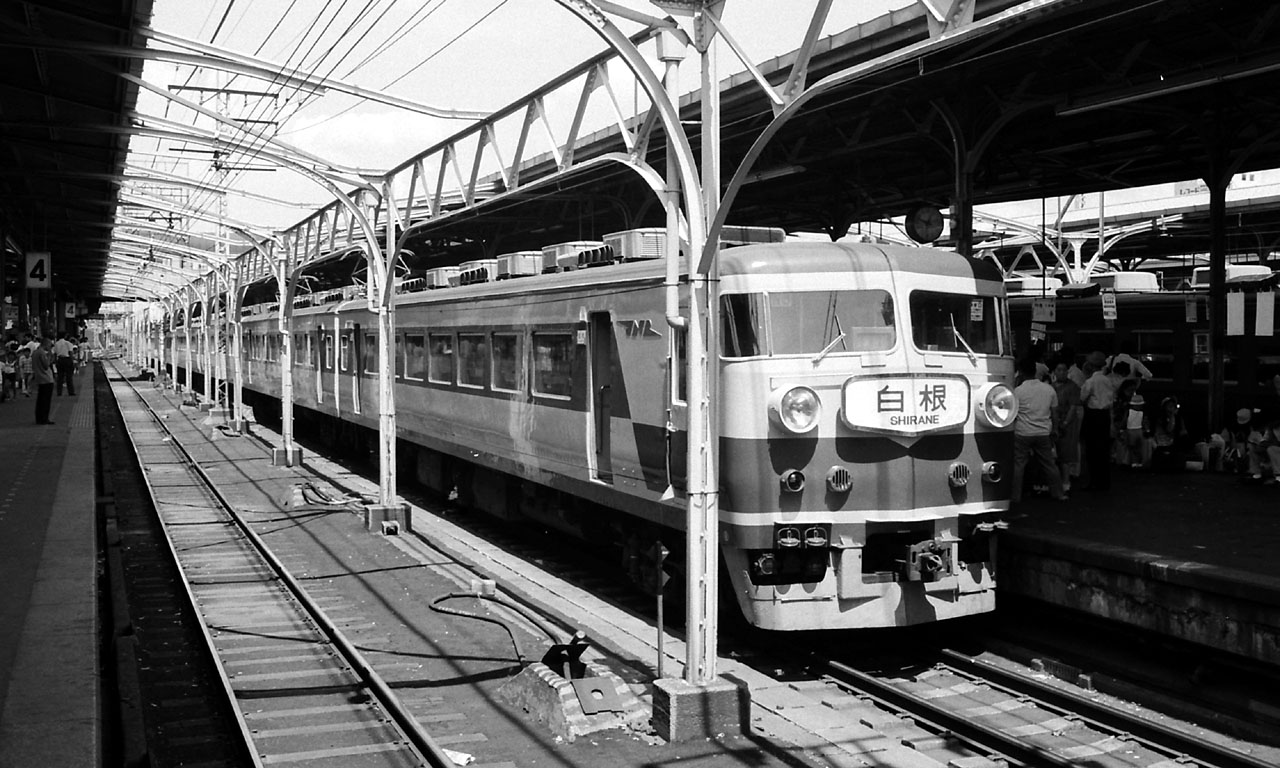
A 157 series set on a Shirane limited express service from Ueno, August 1974

== Fleet details ==
- KuMoHa 157-1 – 10: Driving motor cars
- MoHa 156-1 – 10: Intermediate motor cars, with one pantograph
- SaHa 157-1 – 5: Intermediate trailer cars
- SaRo 157-1 – 6: Intermediate "Green" (first class) trailer cars
- KuRo 157-1: Imperial train car (see below)

== External livery ==
Initially painted in the JNR livery of beige ("Cream No. 4") and crimson ("Red No. 11"), the red colour was later changed to a slightly darker shade ("Red No. 2") when the sets were modified with the addition of air-conditioning.

== KuRo 157-1 imperial train car ==
The 157 series fleet included a dedicated imperial train car, built by Kawasaki Sharyo (present-day Kawasaki Heavy Industries) and delivered in June 1960. Numbered KuRo 157-1, the car could be inserted into 157 series formations for use on imperial train workings. One end had a gangwayed driving cab based on the 153 series EMU design, although the car was normally sandwiched in the middle of a 157 series formation, and was only very rarely used with the driving cab leading. In 1979, the car was modified for use in conjunction with 183 series EMUs, with the first official working on 2 July 1980. From March 1985, it was repainted in cream with a green stripe for use in conjunction with 185 series EMUs.

The last official operation of the car was on 8 September 1993.

Following retirement, the KuRo 157-1 car remained in storage at Tamachi Depot for many years, but was moved to Tokyo General Rolling Stock Centre in the early hours of 2 December 2012.

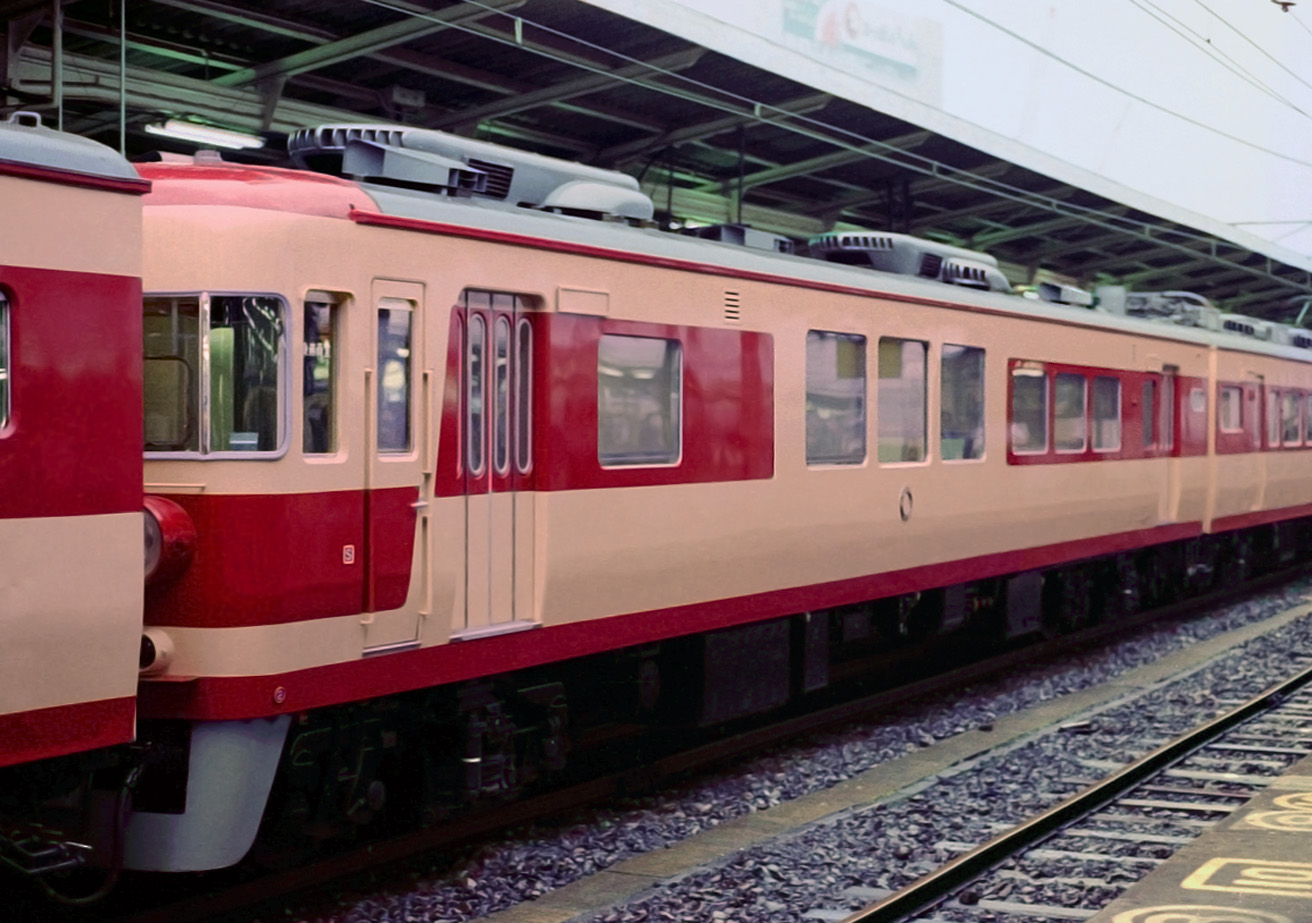
The dedicated imperial train car KuRo 157-1, June 1977

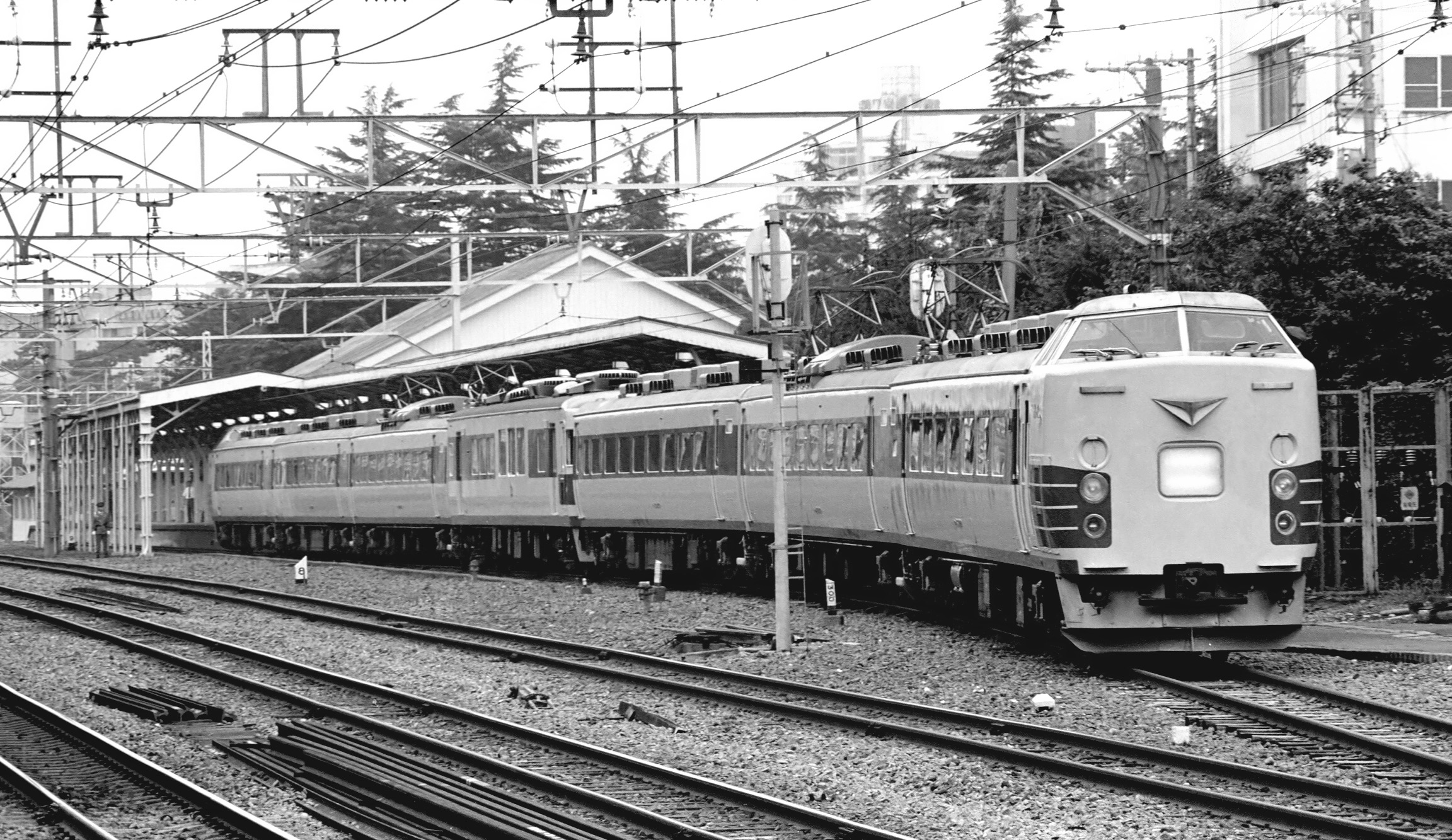
The imperial train car KuRo 157-1 sandwiched in a 183 series set, August 1980

== History ==
The first 157 series set was delivered in August 1959, and entered service on Nikkō semi express services between Tokyo and Nikkō from 22 September 1959. Air-conditioning was added to the trains from 1962.

With the exception of the special imperial train car KuRo 157-1, the entire fleet of 157 series trains was withdrawn by 1980.

== Fleet details ==
The individual car histories are as follows.

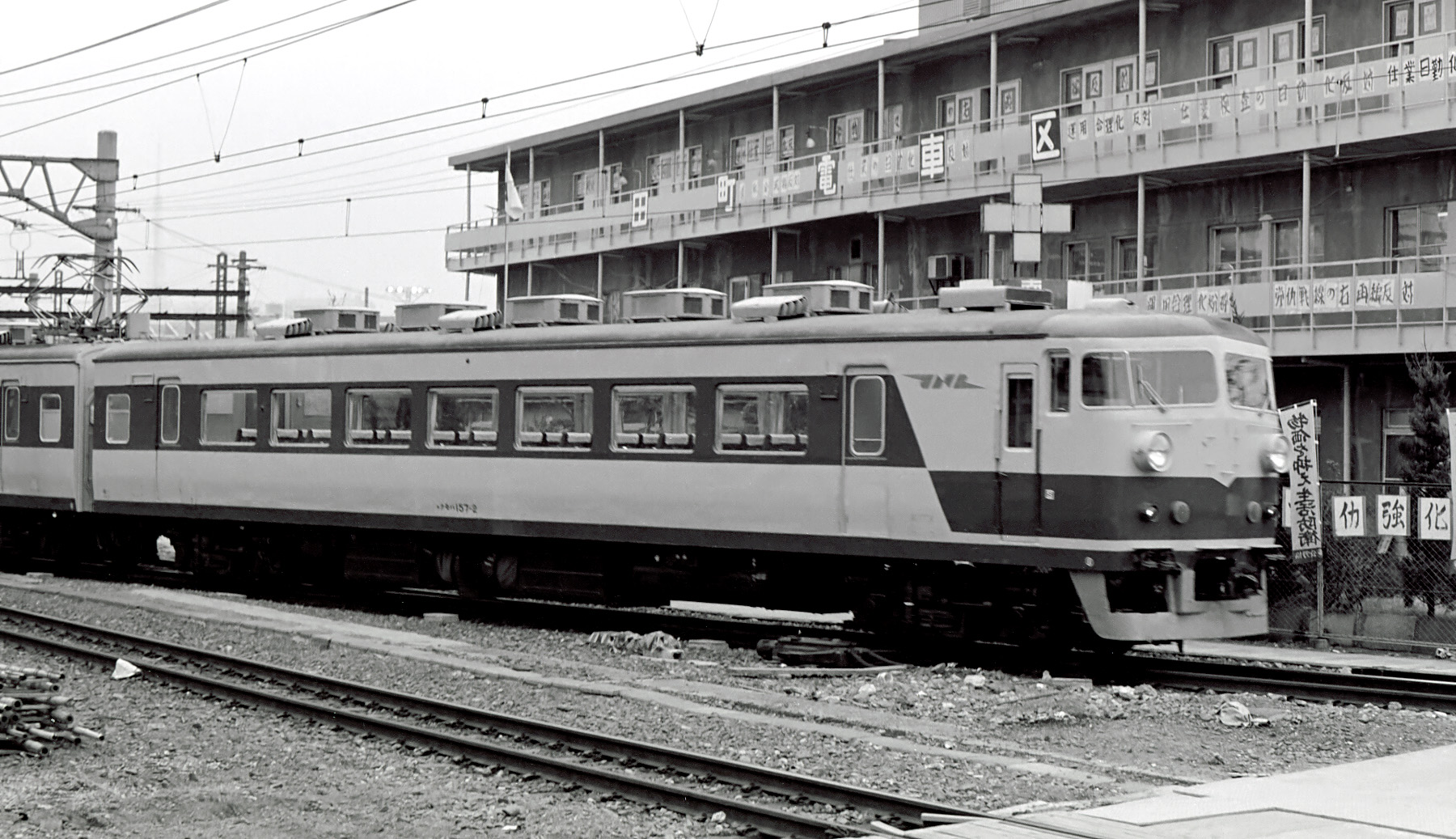
KuMoHa 157-2 in March 1980

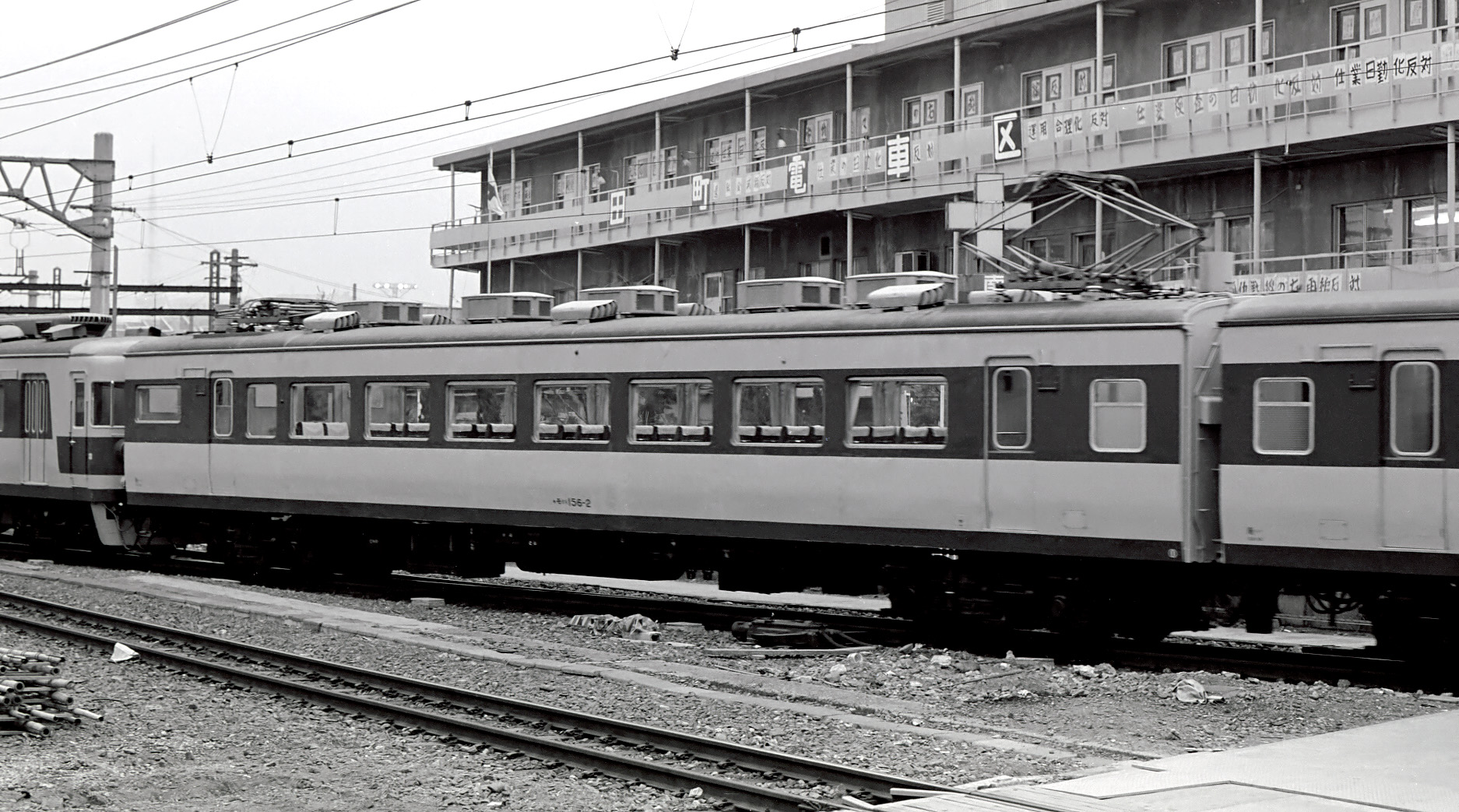
MoHa 156-2 in March 1980

Car No.	Manufacturer	Delivery date	Withdrawal date
KuMoHa 157
KuMoHa 157-1	Kisha	26 August 1959	28 November 1980
KuMoHa 157-2	Kisha	26 August 1959	28 November 1980
KuMoHa 157-3	Kisha	26 August 1959	15 October 1976
KuMoHa 157-4	Nippon Sharyo	15 August 1959	28 June 1976
KuMoHa 157-5	Nippon Sharyo	15 August 1959	15 October 1976
KuMoHa 157-6	Nippon Sharyo	12 December 1959	20 July 1976
KuMoHa 157-7	Nippon Sharyo	15 December 1960	20 July 1976
KuMoHa 157-8	Nippon Sharyo	15 December 1960	28 June 1976
KuMoHa 157-9	Kawasaki Sharyo	12 December 1960	28 June 1976
KuMoHa 157-10	Kawasaki Sharyo	12 December 1960	15 October 1976
MoHa 156
MoHa 156-1	Kisha	26 August 1959	28 November 1980
MoHa 156-2	Kisha	26 August 1959	28 November 1980
MoHa 156-3	Kisha	26 August 1959	15 October 1976
MoHa 156-4	Nippon Sharyo	15 August 1959	28 June 1976
MoHa 156-5	Nippon Sharyo	15 August 1959	15 October 1976
MoHa 156-6	Nippon Sharyo	12 December 1959	20 July 1976
MoHa 156-7	Nippon Sharyo	15 December 1960	20 July 1976
MoHa 156-8	Nippon Sharyo	15 December 1960	28 June 1976
MoHa 156-9	Kawasaki Sharyo	12 December 1960	28 June 1976
MoHa 156-10	Kawasaki Sharyo	12 December 1960	15 October 1976
SaHa 157
SaHa 157-1	Kisha	26 August 1959	20 July 1976
SaHa 157-2	Nippon Sharyo	15 August 1959	15 October 1976
SaHa 157-3	Nippon Sharyo	15 December 1959	20 July 1976
SaHa 157-4	Kawasaki Sharyo	12 December 1960	15 October 1976
SaHa 157-5	Kawasaki Sharyo	12 December 1960	15 October 1976
SaRo 157
SaRo 157-1	Kisha	26 August 1959	20 July 1976
SaRo 157-2	Nippon Sharyo	15 August 1959	28 June 1976
SaRo 157-3	Nippon Sharyo	15 December 1959	20 July 1976
SaRo 157-4	Kawasaki Sharyo	12 December 1960	20 July 1976
SaRo 157-5	Kawasaki Sharyo	12 December 1960	28 June 1976
SaRo 157-6	Nippon Sharyo	18 March 1963	28 June 1976
KuRo 157
KuRo 157-1	Kawasaki Sharyo	8 July 1960	8 September 1993
