= Nikkō (train) =

Japanese limited express train service

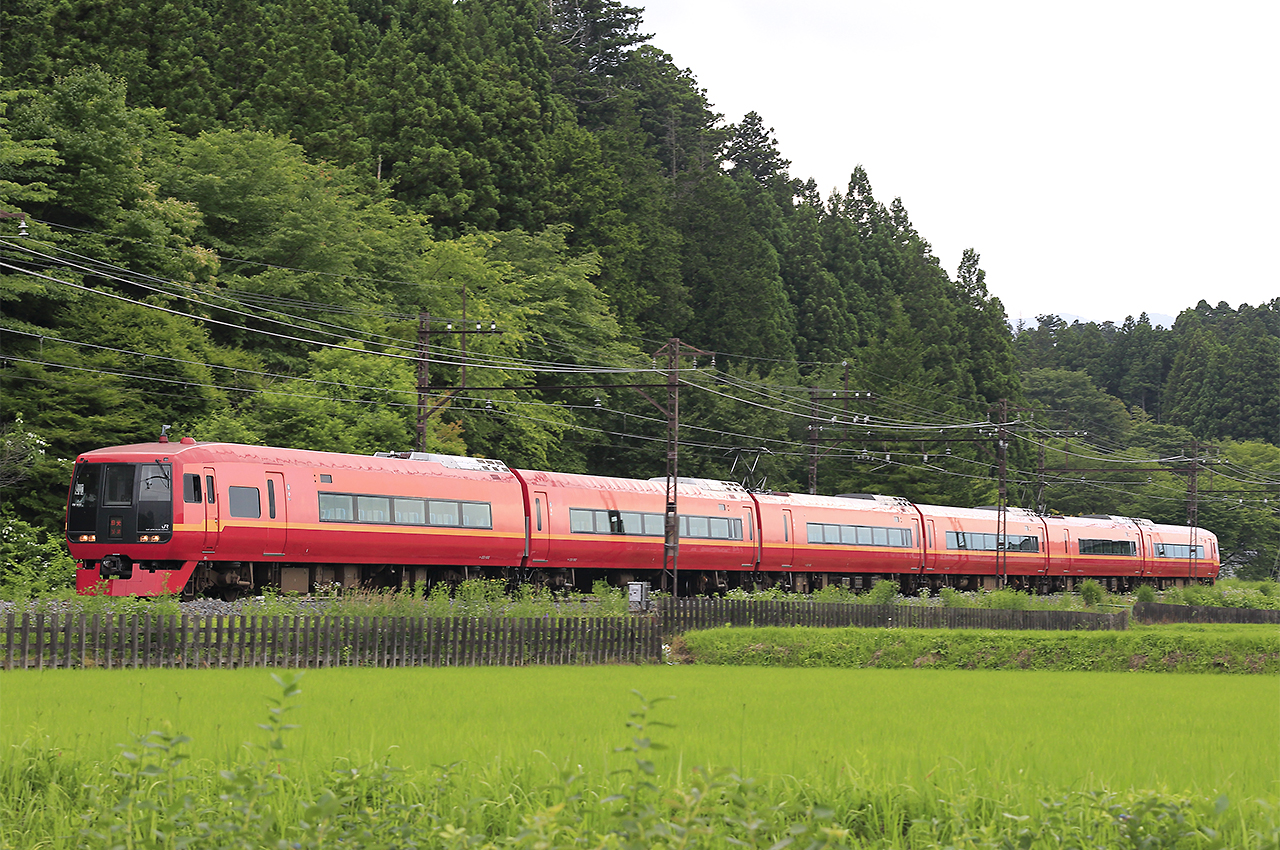
- A 253-1000 series EMU on a Nikko service in June 2017

Overview
- Service type: Limited express
- Locale: Yamanote Freight Line, Tohoku Main Line, Tobu Nikko Line
- First service: 1956 (Semi express); 1963 (Express); 2006 (Limited express)
- Current operator(s): JR East/Tobu Railway
- Former operator(s): JNR

Route
- Termini: Shinjuku; Tōbu Nikkō

Technical
- Rolling stock: 253-1000 series, Tobu 100 series EMUs
- Track gauge: 1,067 mm (3 ft 6 in)
- Electrification: 1,500 V DC overhead
- Operating speed: 120 km/h (75 mph)

The Nikkō (日光) and Spacia Nikkō (スペーシア日光) are limited express train services in Japan operated jointly by the East Japan Railway Company (JR East) and Tobu Railway between Shinjuku in Tokyo and Tōbu Nikkō in Tochigi Prefecture.

== Station stops ==
Nikkō and Spacia Nikkō services stop at the following stations.

- Shinjuku
- Ikebukuro
- Urawa
- Ōmiya
- Tochigi
- Shin-Kanuma
- Shimo-Imaichi
- Tōbu Nikkō

== Rolling stock ==
Since 4 June 2011, services are formed of refurbished 253-1000 series 6-car EMU sets. Tobu 100 series Spacia EMUs may also be substituted on these services, in which case they are named Spacia Nikkō. Prior to 4 June 2011, JR East services were formed of a dedicated 6-car 485 series EMU set, which was occasionally substituted by a reserve 189 series set nicknamed Ayano (彩野).

=== Past ===
- KiHa 44800 DMUs (October 1956–September 1959)
- 157 series EMUs (September 1959–March 1963)
- 165 series EMUs (March 1963–October 1982)
- 485 series/189 series EMUs (March 2006–June 2011)
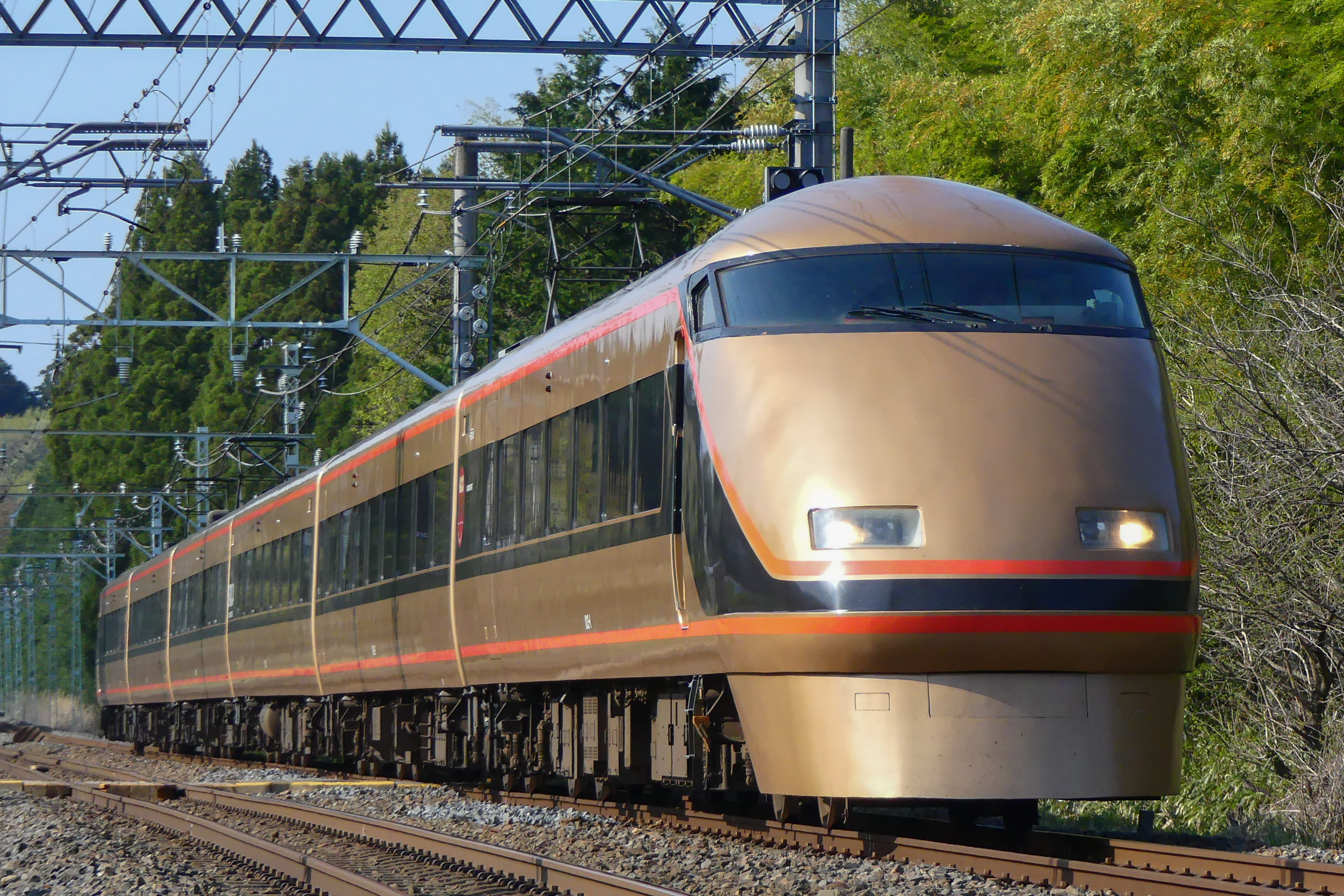
A Tobu 100 series Spacia EMU in special gold "Nikko Moude" livery in April 2017

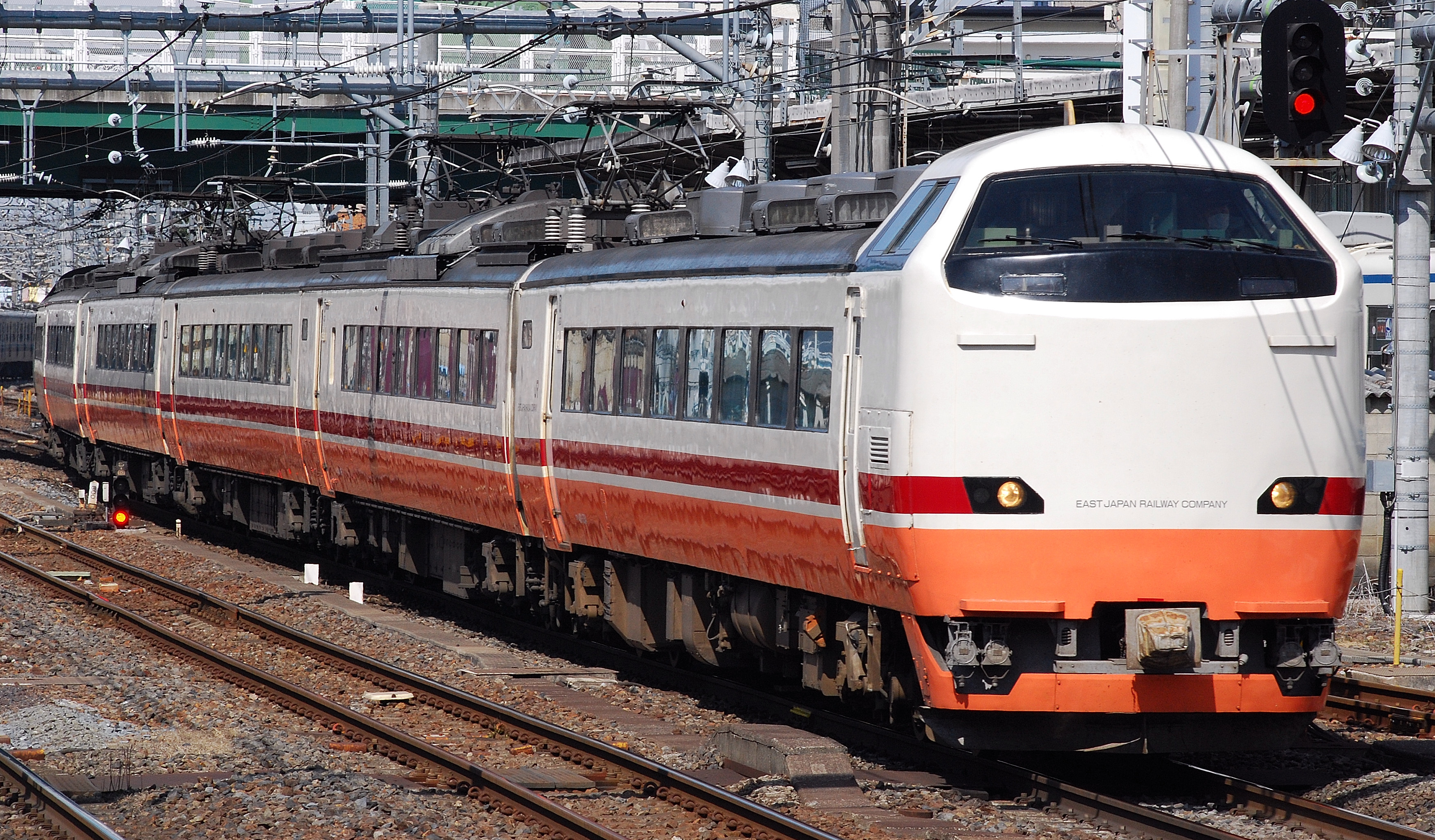
A JR East 485 series EMU at Omiya Station on a Nikko service in March 2011

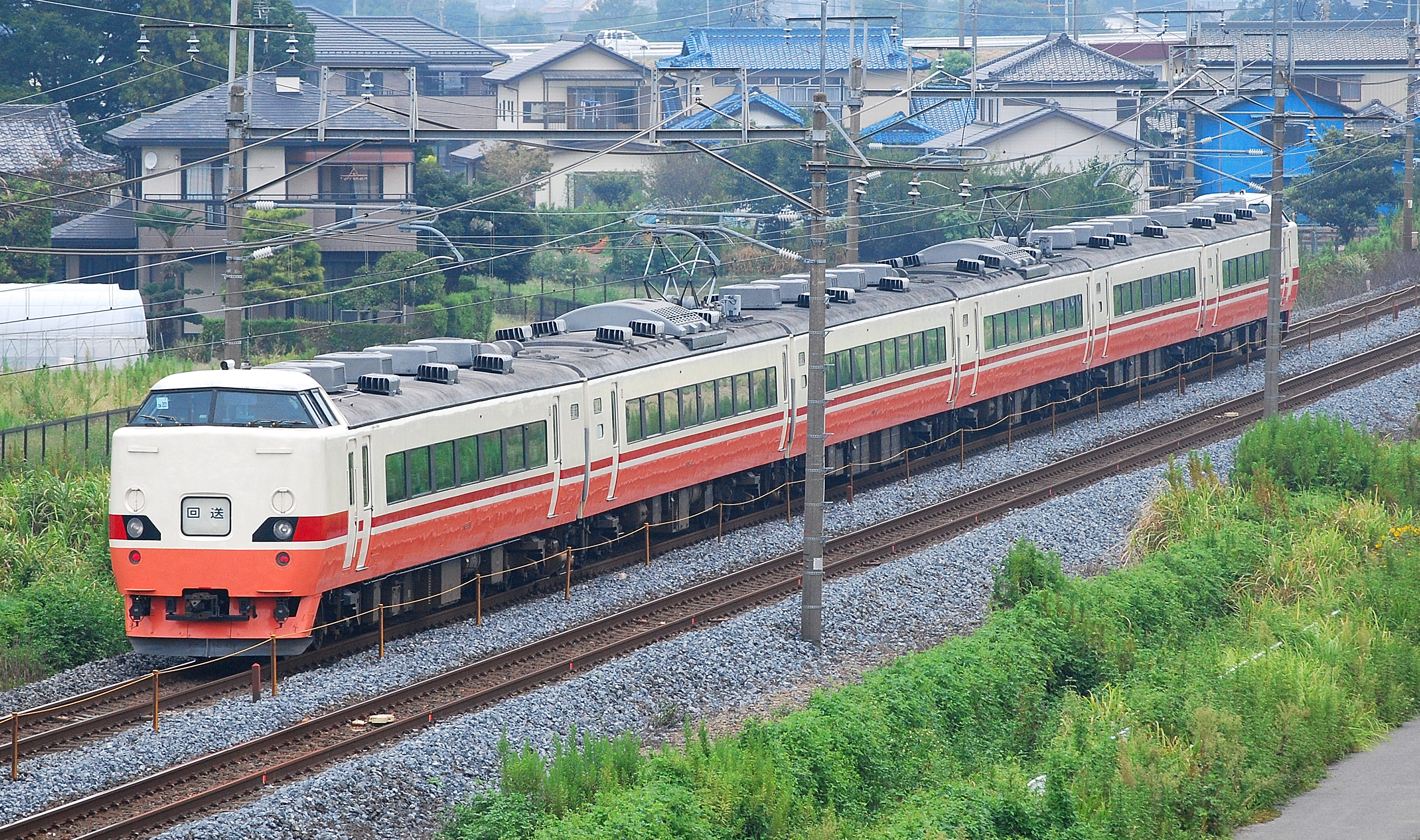
The 189 series Ayano set used as a spare for Nikko services, September 2010

== History ==
=== Semi-express Nikkō ===
The Nikkō service began as a semi-express service between Ueno in Tokyo and Nikkō from 10 October 1956 using KiHa 44800 series DMUs. Following electrification of the line, new 157 series EMUs were introduced from 22 September 1959. These ran as 6-car sets, lengthened to 8 cars during busy seasons. The 157 series sets were subsequently fitted with air-conditioning and transferred to Tokaido Main Line duties.

=== Semi-express Shōnan Nikkō ===
From 1 April 1961, the seasonal Ideyu semi express services that operated between Tokyo and Itō were extended to form new seasonal Shōnan Nikkō services operating between Itō and Nikkō. These were formed of 6-car 157 series sets based at Tamachi Depot in Tokyo. The 157 series EMUs on these services were replaced by 165 series from 25 March 1963. From the October 1968 timetable revision, the services were cut back to a single Nikkō to Itō working, and from 1 October 1970, this service was discontinued, replaced by the Izu 56 working from Tokyo to Itō.

- 2502T Shōnan Nikkō Itō 07:46 → Nikkō 11:59
- 2501T Shōnan Nikkō Nikkō 13:45 → Itō 17:50

The trains were formed as shown below.

Car	1	2	3	4	5	6
Type	KuMoHa 157	MoHa 156	SaRo 157	SaHa 157	MoHa 156	KuMoHa 157

=== Express Nikkō ===
From 25 March 1963, the service was upgraded to "Express" status with the introduction of new 165 series EMUs, running as 7-car formations with the inclusion of a "SaRo" Green (first class) car. This service operated until 14 October 1982, made redundant by the opening of the Tohoku Shinkansen.

=== Limited express Nikkō ===
The name was subsequently revived from 18 March 2006 as a limited express service operated jointly by JR East and Tobu between Shinjuku and Tōbu Nikkō, utilizing a newly constructed link between the two railways' tracks at Kurihashi Station, where trains stop briefly for a crew change.

From the start of the revised timetable on 16 March 2013, Nikkō services also stop at Urawa Station.

== See also ==
- Kinugawa - a similar service between Shinjuku and Kinugawa-Onsen, also jointly operated by JR East and Tobu
