= Soyokaze =

Express train service in Japan (1968–2012)

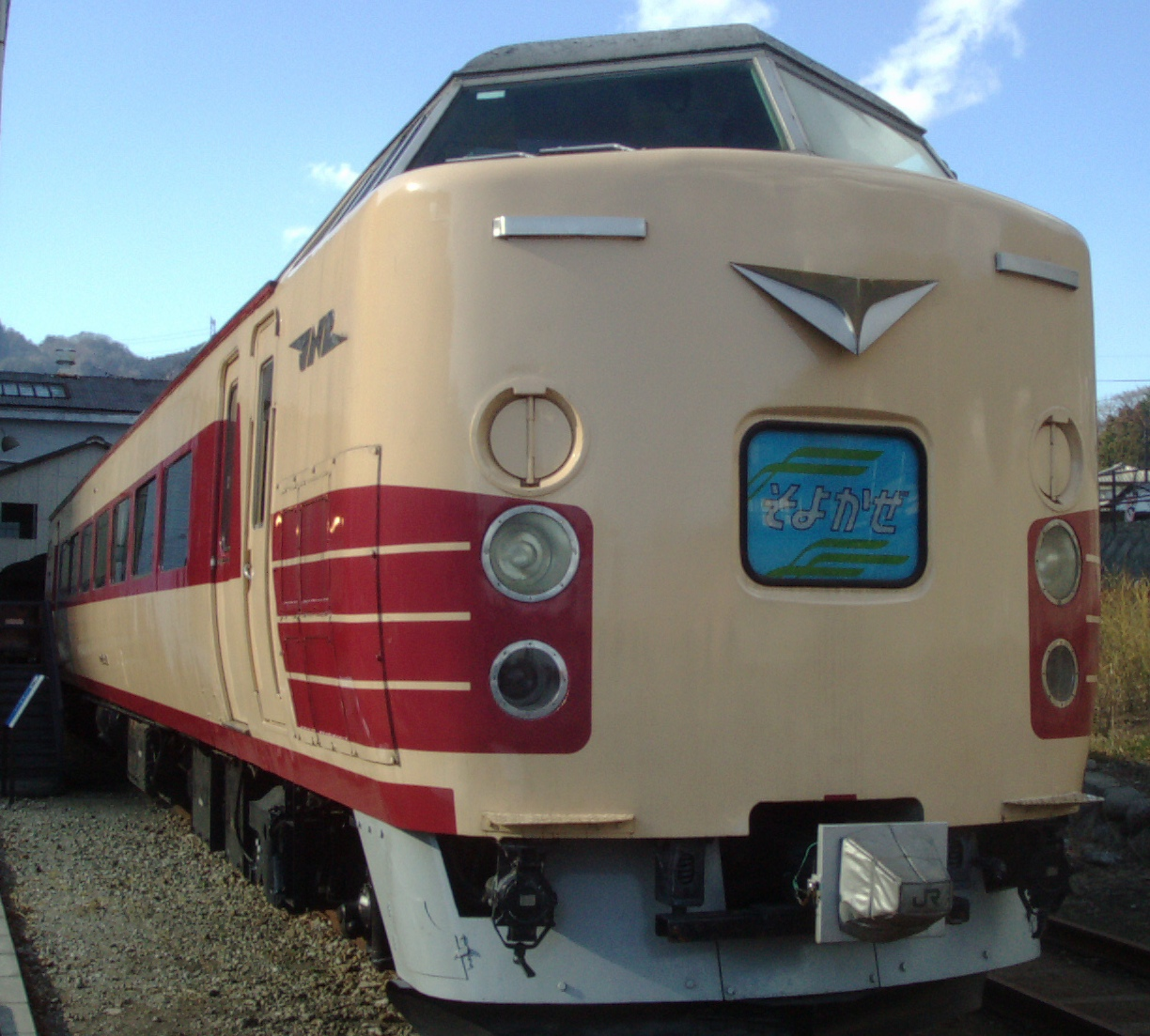
- A preserved 189 series EMU with a Soyokaze headboard, December 2004

Overview
- Service type: Limited express
- Status: Discontinued
- Locale: Honshu, Japan
- First service: 26 July 1968
- Former operator(s): JNR; JR East

Route
- Termini: Ueno; Naka-Karuizawa
- Distance travelled: 146.5 km (91.0 mi)
- Line(s) used: Shinetsu Main Line

On-board services
- Class(es): Green + Standard

Technical
- Rolling stock: 157 series, 181 series, 183 series, 185 series, 189 series, 489 series EMUs
- Track gauge: 1,067 mm (3 ft 6 in)
- Electrification: 1,500 V DC overhead

The Soyokaze (そよかぜ) was a limited express train service in Japan introduced by Japanese National Railways (JNR) in July 1968, and later operated by the East Japan Railway Company (JR East) between Ueno in Tokyo and Naka-Karuizawa on the Shinetsu Main Line in Nagano Prefecture.

== Rolling stock ==
Services were originally formed using 157 series EMUs, and services later used 181 series, 183 series, 185 series, 189 series, and 489 series EMUs.

== Formation ==
9-car 489 series formations operating in later years were typically formed as shown below, with car 1 at the Ueno end.

Car No.	1	2	3	4	5	6	7	8	9
Numbering	KuHa 489	MoHa 488	MoHa 489	SaRo 489	MoHa 488	MoHa 489	MoHa 488	MoHa 489	KuHa 489
Accommodation	Reserved	Reserved	Reserved	Green	Reserved	Non-reserved	Non-reserved	Non-reserved	Non-reserved

== History ==
Soyokaze services were first introduced on 20 July 1968 as seasonal limited express services operating between Tokyo and Naka-Karuizawa to supplement the Asama services which operated between Ueno and Nagano. The services initially used 157 series EMUs, which had been removed from former Hibiki services in September 1964.

From 1969, 181 series EMUs, also used on Asama services were introduced on Soyokaze services.

When first introduced, Soyokaze services featured reserved accommodation only, but from 15 November 1982, non-reserved cars were also included.

From the start of the revised timetable on 14 March 1985, 9-car 489 series EMUs were introduced on Soyokaze services.

From 3 December 1994, Soyokaze was down-graded to become an occasional service run between Ueno and Nagano, and was phased out before the opening of the Nagano Shinkansen.

== Special services ==
=== Salon Express Soyokaze ===
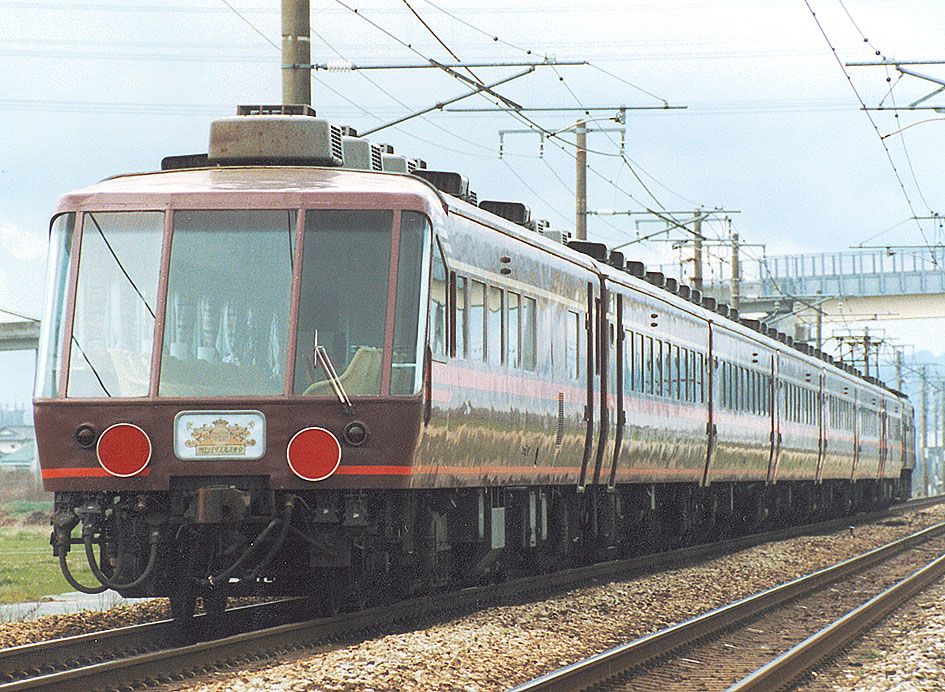
The Salon Express Tokyo locomotive-hauled trainset

Seasonal Salon Express Soyokaze services operated between 28 April 1984 and 5 May 1988 using the Salon Express Tokyo Joyful Train locomotive-hauled trainset.

=== Revival Soyokaze ===
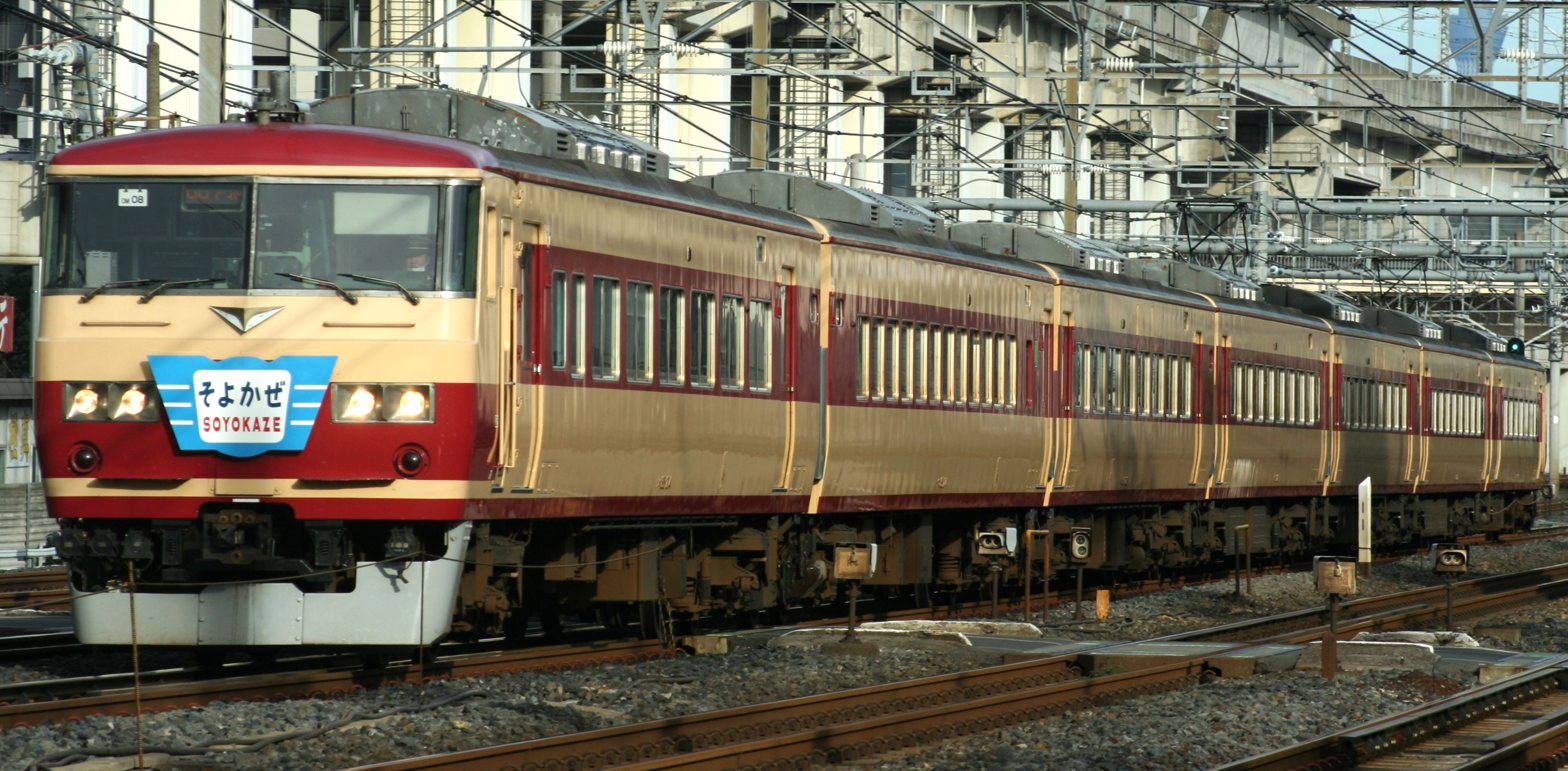
Reliveried 185 series EMU set OM8 on a special Soyokaze working, July 2012

On 30 and 31 August 2003, JR East operated a special Soyokaze service between Ueno and Yokokawa using 189 series EMUs.

On 15 July 2012, JR East ran a special Soyokaze service between Ueno and Yokokawa using a 185 series EMU in "Amagi"-style JNR era livery.

On 8 September 2012, JR East ran a Soyokaze service between Ueno and Yokokawa using a 185 series EMU in "Amagi"-style JNR era livery. The Shinano Railway also ran a special Soyokaze limited express service between Karuizawa and Ueda on the same day, as part of the 15th anniversary celebrations of the creation of the Shinano Railway.

== See also ==
- List of named passenger trains of Japan
