= KiHa 80 series =

Diesel multiple train unit type operated in Japan

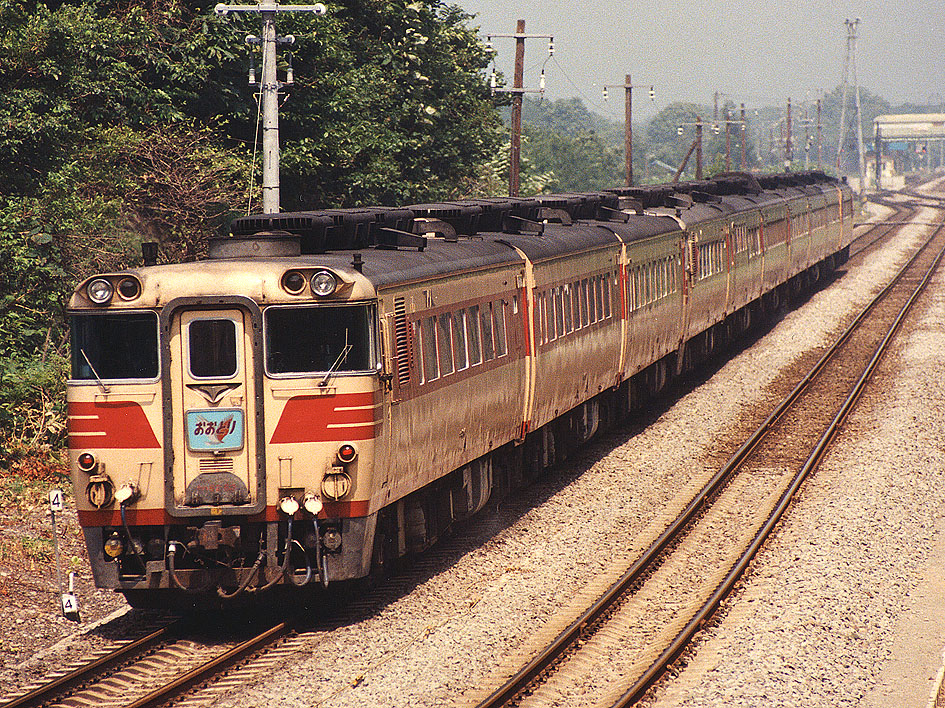
- KiHa 82 series Ōtori service, 1986
- In service: 1960–2002
- Manufacturers: Fuji Heavy Industries, Hitachi, Kawasaki Heavy Industries, Kinki Sharyo, Kisha Seizo, Niigata Tekko, Nippon Sharyo, Teikoku Sharyo, Tokyu Car Corporation
- Constructed: 1960 (KiHa 81); 1961–1967 (KiHa 82)
- Scrapped: 1982–2009
- Successor: KiHa 181 series; KiHa 183 series; 485 series
- Operators: JNR (1960–1987); JR Hokkaido (1987–2002); JR Central (1987–2002)

Specifications
- Car length: 21,300 mm (69 ft 11 in) (KiHa 81); 21,100 mm (69 ft 3 in) (KiHa 82)
- Width: 2,903 mm (9 ft 6 in)
- Maximum speed: 100 km/h (62 mph)
- Engine type: Diesel
- Track gauge: 1,067 mm (3 ft 6 in)

Notes/references
- This train won the 4th Blue Ribbon Award in 1961. ※ Awarded for KiHa 81 series This train won the 30th Blue Ribbon Award in 1987. ※ Awarded for KiHa 84 series Furano Express set

The KiHa 80 series (キハ80系) was a diesel multiple unit type that operated on express services from 1960 to 2002, under Japan National Railways and later under JR Hokkaido and JR Central. Two variants were initially built: the KiHa 81 series (キハ81系) to replace the then steam-operated Hatsukari services in 1960, and the KiHa 82 series (キハ82系) for other services from 1961 to 1967; the KiHa 81 series sets would receive the fourth Blue Ribbon Award for outstanding design from the Japan Railfan Club.

The "KiHa" designation derives from the classification system used by JNR. "Ki" indicates a diesel-powered vehicle, while "Ha" indicates an ordinary passenger car, as opposed to a green car.

By early 1960, the new cars were scheduled to start service in December of that year. After a promotional film of the KiHa 81 series was shot between September 15–23, 1960, and a demonstration was given to the participants of the 1960 Asian Railways Conference on October 14, the sets began operating Hatsukari services as planned on December 10.

In the late 1980s, three resort trains were built based on the series: two KiHa 84 series (キハ84系) trains (the Furano Express and Tomamu Sahoro Express) and one remodeled KiHa 82 train (the Resort Liner). The Furano Express would be reliveried from June to October 1987 as part of a promotion with All Nippon Airways, and win the 30th Blue Ribbon Award in the same year; the Tomamu Sahoro Express set would participate in a Shikoku event showcasing the trains of all JR Group companies in 1989.

By the time of its retirement in 2002, it had been superseded by various multiple units such as the KiHa 183, KiHa 181, and 485 series. Most cars were scrapped by 2009, but some were preserved, including a KiHa 81 lead car at the Kyoto Railway Museum, and a KiHa 82 lead car on the Hakkōda Maru.

== Background ==
After World War II, limited express services used only the Tōkaidō and San'yō Main Lines and part of the Kagoshima Main Line. This was due to low demand for express services in rural areas due to most of the population already residing on the Tōkaidō Main Line, as well as lack of electrification in many areas; only the Tōkaidō, Takasaki and Jōetsu lines were electrified by 1956, necessitating the use of steam locomotives on most lines.

Steam locomotives were used widely in Japan during the mid-20th century, reaching a peak of 5,958 in 1946. Whilst necessary due to its significant role in transporting freight, there were disadvantages: when changing directions at terminal stations, steam locomotives would need to be shunted. Furthermore, due to the railway standards in Japan, they were considered inferior to trains with multiple motor cars (especially the electric multiple units operating between Tokyo and Osaka at the time).

== History ==
=== 1958–1960: Development, promotion and start of services ===
In early 1960, the new cars were scheduled to start service in December of that year.

On September 15, 1960, a promotional film using a KiHa 81 series set was filmed on the Kawagoe Line, which was followed by filming on the Jōban Line and the Tōhoku Main Line between September 18 and 23. On October 14, a special train carrying the participants of that year's Asian Railways Conference made a round trip between Tokyo and Nikkō. The remaining 17 KiHa 81 series cars were inaugurated between October 31 and November 18, 1960, and started on the Hatsukari service on December 10.

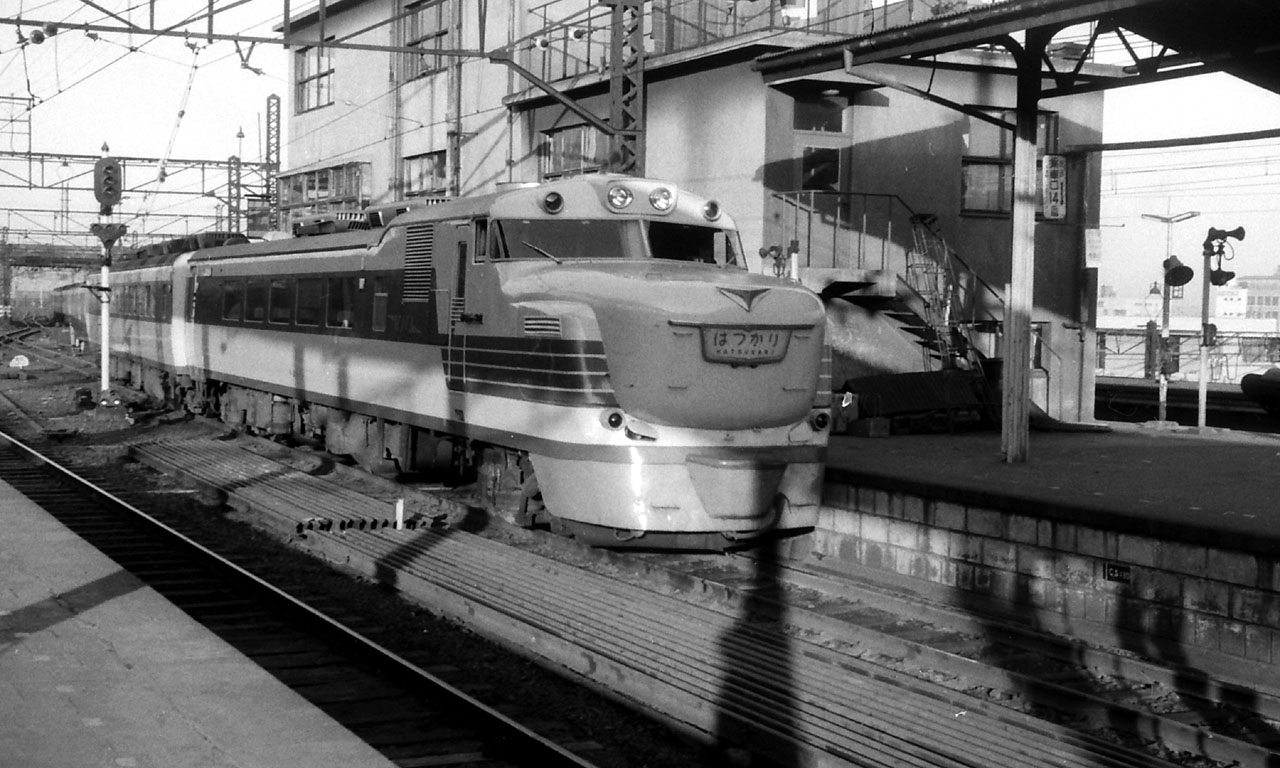
KiHa 81 series set arriving at Ueno in Tokyo on a Hatsukari service, 1961

=== 1961–1972: Expansion of services, and mechanical problems ===
In the October 1961 timetable revision, the number of daily limited express services was increased from 9 to 26; to meet that demand, 7 cars would be allocated to Hibari services in April 1962.

These cars, along with a further 127 cars (15 of which were allocated to the Hakodate depot), were KiHa 82 series cars. They would be allocated to the following services:

- Ōzora (Hakodate to Asahikawa - one return working daily)
- Hakuchō (白鳥) (Osaka to Aomori via Ueno - one return working daily)
- Hibari (Ueno to Sendai - one return working daily)
- Tsubasa (Ueno to Akita - one return working daily)
- Matsukaze (Kyoto to Matsue - one return working daily)
- Kamome (Kyoto to Miyazaki via Nagasaki - one return working daily)
- Midori (Osaka to Hakata - one return working daily)
- Heiwa (Osaka to Hiroshima - one return working daily)

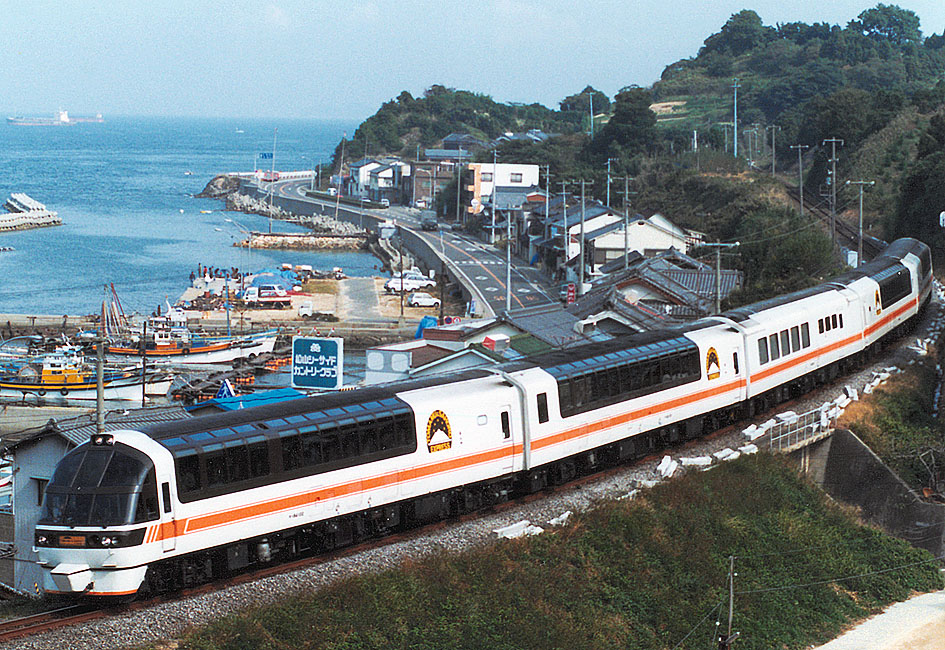
Tomamu Sahoro Express set running between Kikuma and Asanami on the Yosan Line as part of event, 1989

However, some mechanical problems would become apparent; on the first day of the timetable revision, one Matsukaze service departed 40 minutes late as the Kiha 82-40 car had to undertake repairs at Fukuchiyama due to axle overheating, and dining service in the KiShi 80 car was suspended due to the resulting lack of power supply. On the return trip, the KiHa 82-27 car was switched to face towards Kyoto, and the KiHa 28-7 car was assigned to the rear of the train - it would be exchanged with the KiHa 82-40 car at Toyooka.

Shuichiro Yamanouchi, the JNR district manager for Mukōmachi, would describe in his book If There Was No Shinkansen... (新幹線がなかったら, Shinkansen ga nakattara) how he used spare cars (which were intended for Midori services) for spare parts in event of any problems, and to make up for a shortage of such parts.

Between 1964 and 1972, these services would start using the KiHa 82 series sets:

- Ōtori (Hakodate to Abashiri and Kushiro - one return working daily)
- Hokuto (北斗) (Hakodate to Sapporo and Asahikawa - one return working daily)
- Hokkai (北海) (Hakodate to Asahikawa - one return working daily)

In September 1968, after the entirety of the Tohoku Main Line was electrified, with the section between Ueno and Sendai being duplicated, the KiHa 81 series sets would be replaced by 583 series trains on Hatsukari services.

=== 1972–1987: Pre-JNR privatization, and gradual replacement ===
==== Kuroshio, Hida and Nanki services ====
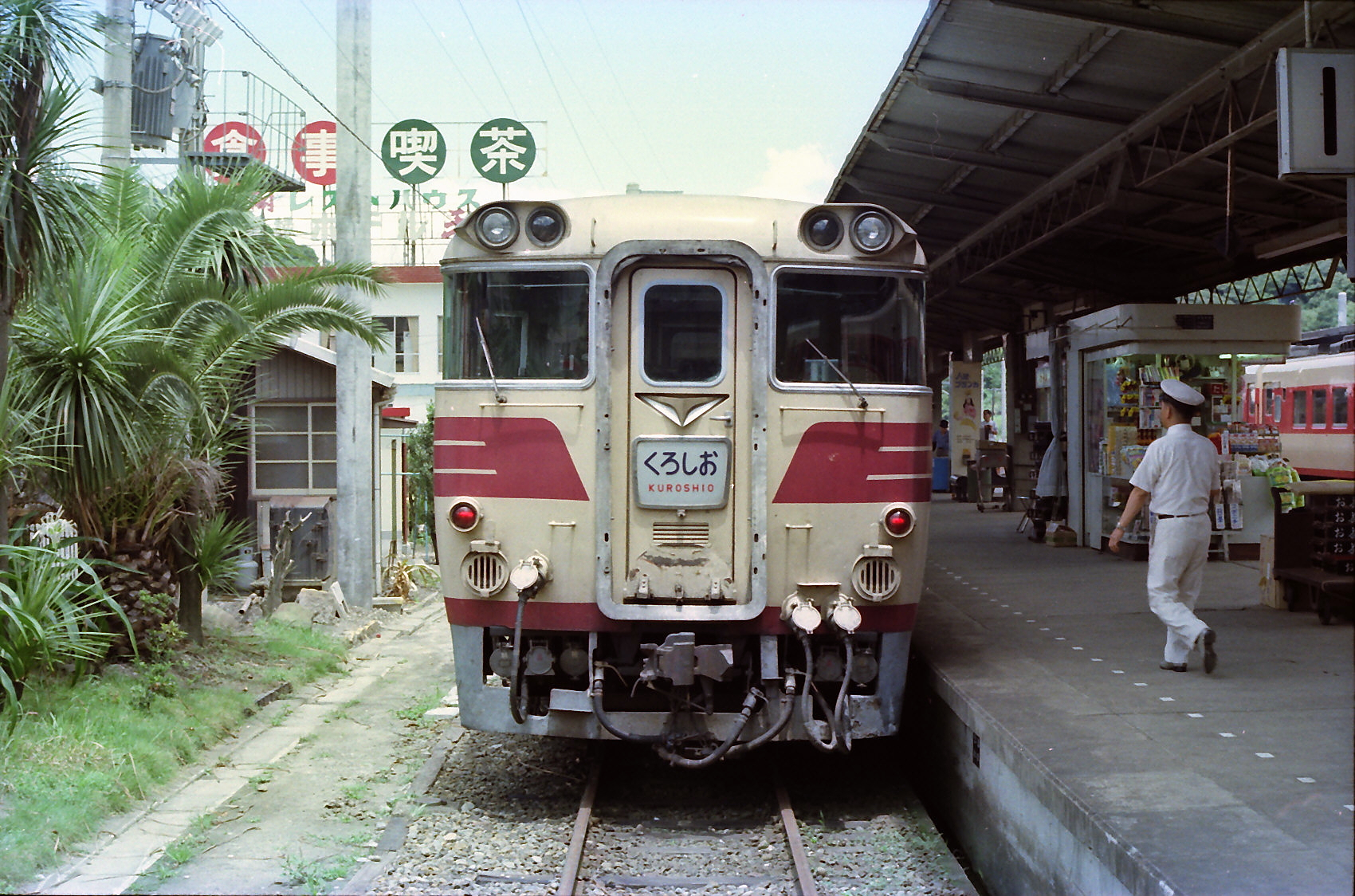
KiHa 82 on Kuroshio service stopped at Shirahama, 1976

In the October 1, 1976 timetable revision, 12 surplus cars (which were used on Oki services) were transferred from Mukaikamachi Depot, and two Hida return workings using KiHa 82 series cars were added between Nagoya and Takayama.

In the October 2, 1978 timetable revision, 36 surplus cars were transferred from Wakayama Locomotive Works, as Kuroshio trains were replaced by 381 series trains due to the electrification of Shingu Station on the Kise Main Line. Three Nanki return workings ran between Nagoya and Kii-Katsuura, which was a non-electrified section. The number of Hida services was increased by one to four. In 1982, nine surplus cars were transferred from Mukōmachi, and five old cars were scrapped, and on November 15 of the same year, the timetable was revised to include six-car trains.

In the March 14, 1985 timetable revision, the Hida services were changed from one round trip to/from Kanazawa to one round trip to/from Hida-Furukawa, and the Nanki services were shortened to four-car sets. At the time of privatization on April 1, 1987, 50 cars were transferred to the Central Japan Railway Company (JR Central), which continued to operate four Hida round trips and five Nanki round trips.

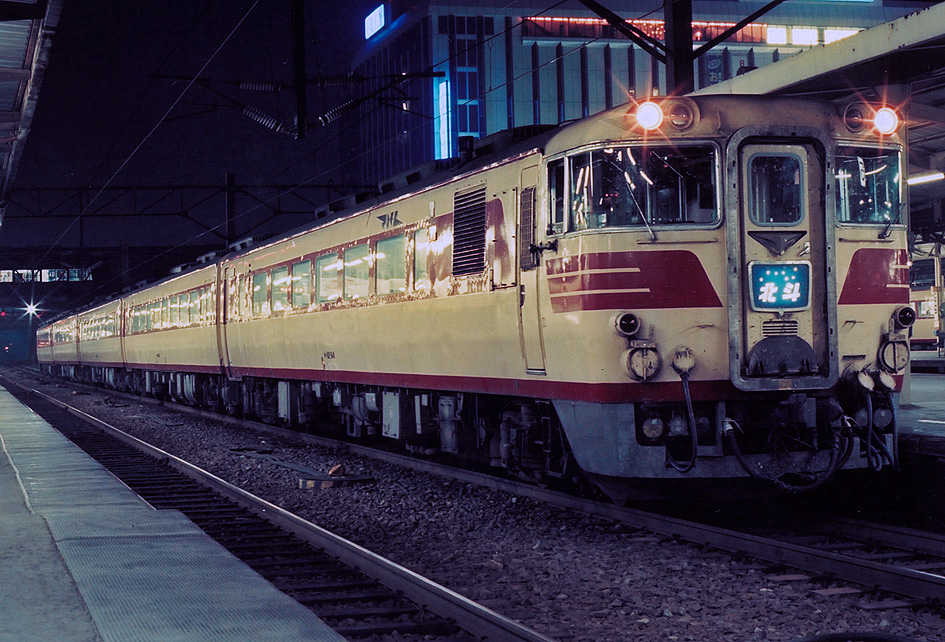
KiHa 82 series set on Hokuto service stopped at Sapporo, 1986

==== Services in Hokkaido (Ōzora, Hokuto, Ōtori and Hokkai) ====
In the October 1, 1981 timetable revision, the number of Ōzora return workings using KiHa 80 series sets would be reduced to one, and the number of cars on Ōtori services would be reduced by one. Three Hokuto return workings (along with one Ōzora service) were transferred to the Sapporo Depot.

In the March 14, 1985 timetable revision, the position of the KiShi 80 and KiRo 80 cars would be reversed on Ōtori services, whilst two Ōzora services to Obihiro were added (one operated in conjunction with Hokkai services) and the one remaining Hokuto service using the KiHa 80 series would become a seasonal-only train. In the November 1, 1986 timetable revision (the last before the privatization of JNR), all services in Hokkaido using KiHa 80 series sets were either replaced by KiHa 183 series sets, or removed from regular service.

=== 1987–2002: Joyful Trains, final services and retirement ===
==== JR Hokkaido ====
After the privatization of JNR, 15 cars would be allocated to the then newly formed JR Hokkaido:

KiHa 80 series cars inherited by JR Hokkaido
KiHa 82	KiHa 80	KiShi 80
80・81・86・102・108・109	144・152・156・160・161・166	29・36・37

Of these cars, KiHa 82-109 would be converted to KiHa 80-501 for the Furano Express; KiHa 80-160 and KiHa 80-166 would be converted to KiHa 84 series cars, along with the KiHa 82-86 car being converted into a KiHa 83 series car, to make up the Tomamu Sahoro Express. Due to the aging of the modified cars, operation of the Furano Express was terminated in 1998. The Tomamu Sahoro Express was converted to the Mount Lake livery in 1999, but the operation was terminated in the summer season of 2002. Both trains would be scrapped in 2004 (with the exception of KiShi 80-501, which would last until 2007).

The remaining cars - unmodified KiHa 82-102/108 and KiHa 80-144/152/161 cars - were used in a 5-car formation on various services. Several farewell services were run, starting September 25, 1992 with a service from Sapporo to Hakodate (via the Hakodate Main Line), on September 26, 1992, with another Hakodate to Sapporo service (this time via the Muroran Main Line and Chitose Line), and on September 27–28, 1992 with a farewell Sapporo round trip service (via Kushiro and Abashiri); the set would be withdrawn on October 2, 1992.

==== JR Central ====
KiHa 80 series cars inherited by JR Central
KiHa 82	KiHa 80	KiRo 80
73 - 77・82・84・88 - 91 93・94・96 - 99・105	96 - 99・101 - 104・110・113・114 117 - 120・125 - 129・133・136・138・142・162	44・47・48 51・56・59 - 62

From 1987 until 1994, KiHa 80 series sets would be used for the Suzuka F1 temporary service that ran directly from Nagoya to Suzuka Circuit Inō on the Ise Line during the Japanese Grand Prix, and to transport spectators to night games held at the Nagoya Stadium via the Nagoya Port Line.

By 1994, 22 cars were still in service. Some of these cars were used on special farewell services - the Memorial Hida event train on October 25 of the same year, the Gotemba Line 60th Anniversary temporary rapid train between Shizuoka and Gotemba on November 27, and on December 11, the Hida special train on the Takayama Main Line. On January 21, 1995, its final service - the Memorial Nanki - was operated. The nine regular cars and three Resort Liner cars that were registered at that time were scrapped during the same year, with the exception of the KiHa 82-73/105 and KiHa 80-60/99 cars.

== Manufactured cars ==
=== KiHa 81 series ===
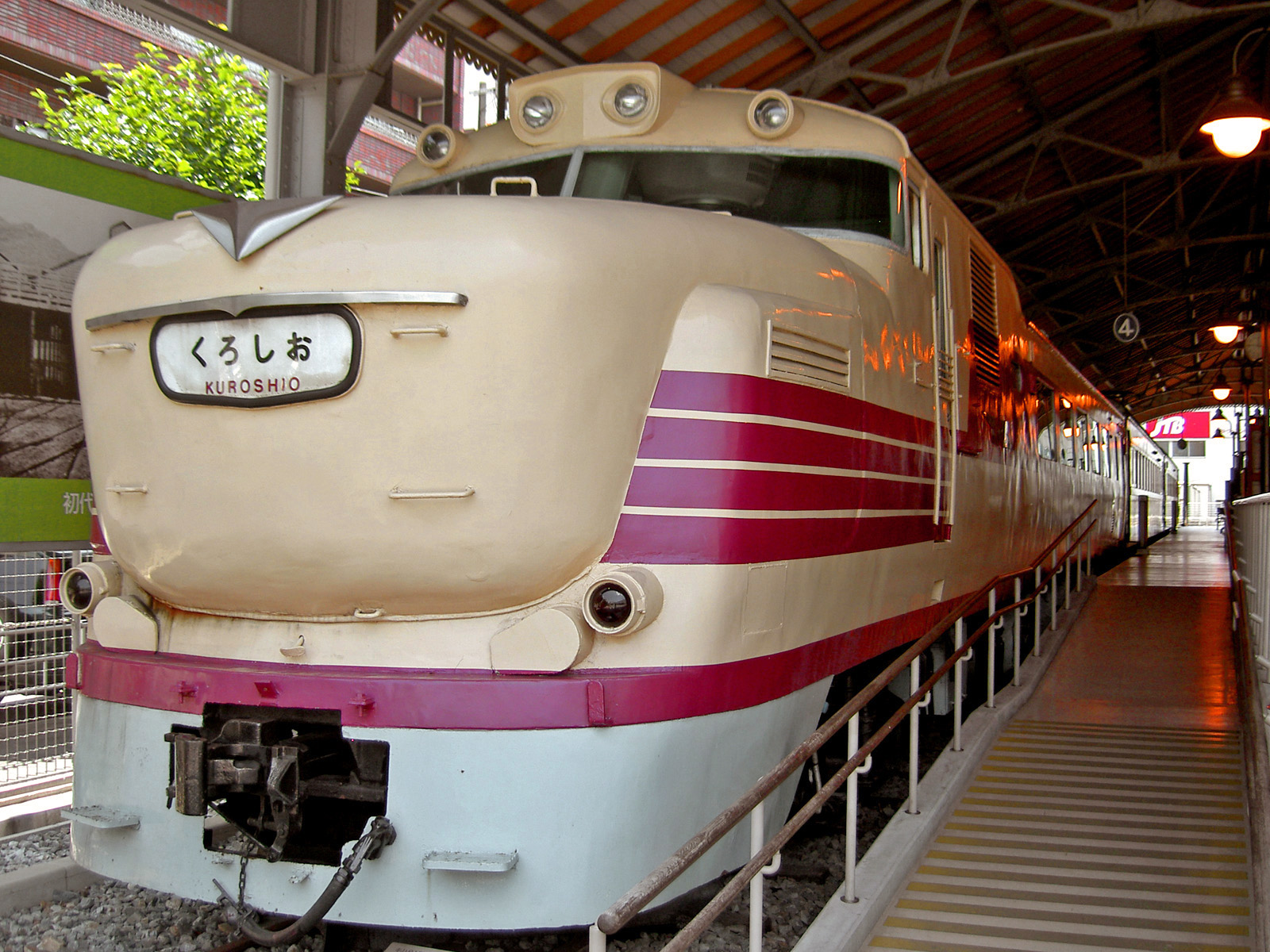
KiHa 81–3 on display at the former Modern Transportation Museum, 2006

In 1960, two nine-car sets (along with eight extra cars) of what would be known as the KiHa 81 series were manufactured. These trains were also named the Hatsukari after the services on which they were introduced. In 1961, these sets received the fourth Blue Ribbon Award from the Japan Railfan Club.

Between 1968 and 1970, six of these cars (three KiRo 80 and three KiSaShi 80 cars) were refurbished into 900-series cars.

Classification	Car nos. (Note: (e.g. KiHa 81-1))	No. built	Notes	Ref.
KiHa 81	1–6	6	A driving car with a capacity of 40 passengers, it was equipped with both an engine and a power generator. It was modeled on the 151 series trains, but with a few differences; the cab was set lower, and the car had increased width. Most of the hood was used to house the engine, and a wide opening structure was adopted for maintenance purposes.	
KiHa 80	1–12	12	An intermediate car equipped with two running engines, it had a capacity of 72 passengers. Unlike the KiHa 81 driving car, which differed between the KiHa 81 and KiHa 82 sets, the KiHa 80 cars remained consistent in design. Ten of the cars would be in service until 1983, whilst the remaining two were scrapped in 1977.	
KiRo 80	1–5	5	An intermediate first-class car equipped with two engines, it had a capacity of 48 passengers. It was also equipped with a bathroom at both the front and the rear of the carriage. Initially, the sets made use of a radio antenna on the roof to provide in-seat radio, but it was removed due to difficulties with maintenance. Three were later converted to regular cars (1 and 5 were remodeled into KiHa 82 900 series lead cars, and 2 was remodeled into a KiHa 80 900 series car), whilst the remaining two were scrapped by 1977.	
KiSaShi 80	1–3	3	A dining car equipped with an engine, it had a capacity of 40 passengers. A train position indicator, which was also installed on 151 series trains, was installed here. Later, all three cars were equipped with running engines and remodeled to KiShi 80 900 series cars.	

=== KiHa 82 series ===
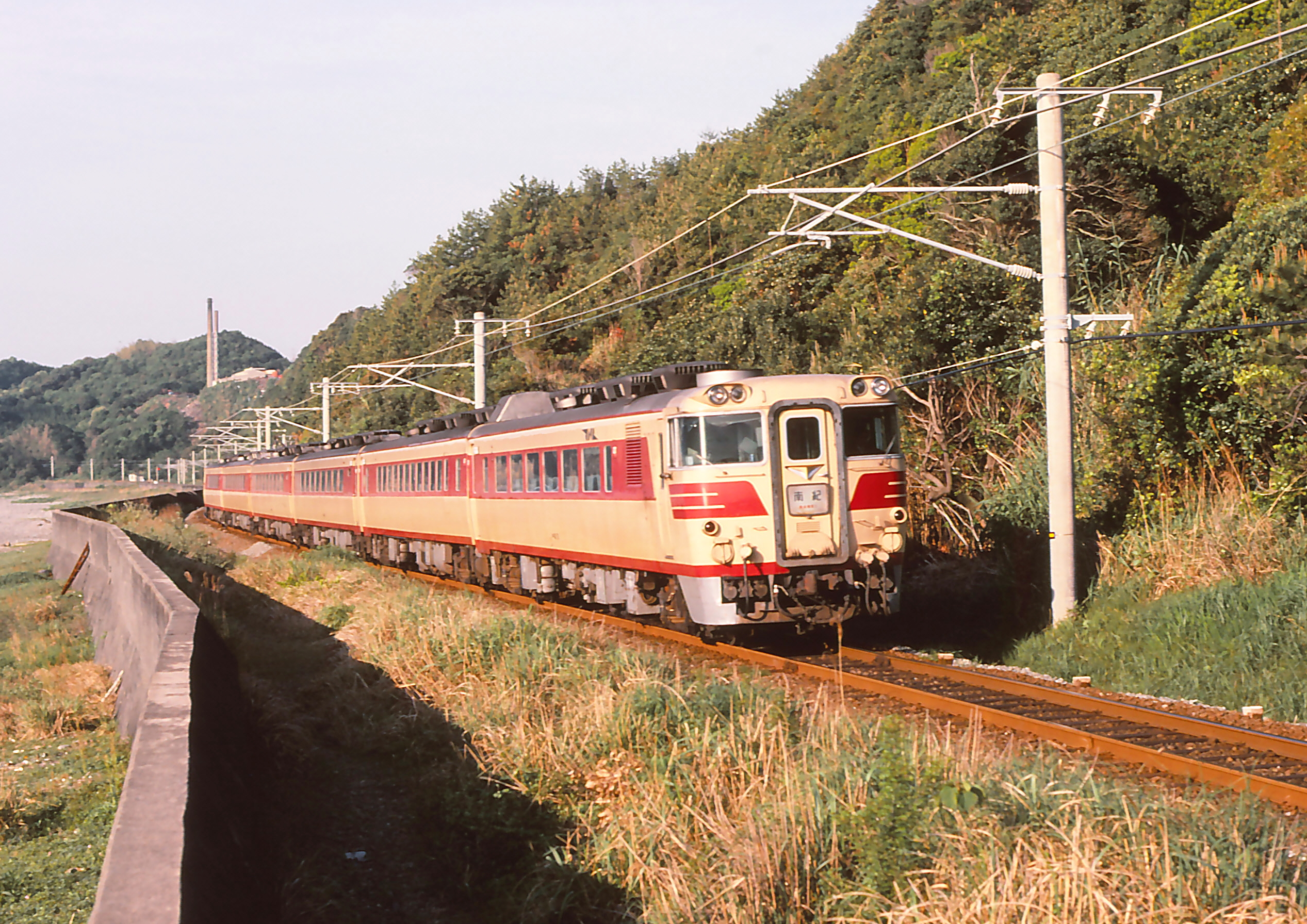
KiHa 82 series set on a Nanki service between Shingū and Miwasaki, 1979

At the end of 1960, JNR started work on a redesign of the KiHa 81 series, with a focus on fixing the set's flaws and finding possible improvements. The KiHa 82 series, which included newly designed lead and intermediate cars, was manufactured after 1961.

Classification	Car nos.	No. built	Notes	Ref.
KiHa 82	1–110	110	A lead power car equipped with a gangway, it had a capacity of 52 passengers, which was 12 more than the KiHa 81 lead car. This was the result of design improvements, which included the removal of the hood, along with adopting a walk-through cab. Other improvements included an addition of a toilet and washroom, alongside an enlarged cabin.	
KiHa 80	13–166	154	These cars differed from those built in 1960 in that the bogies were changed and heat shielding was installed around the engine and exhaust.	
KiRo 80	6–62	57	In addition to the bogie and engine changes like that on the KiHa 80 cars, the seat radio was eliminated due to poor reception in rural areas, and the difficulties of cleaning the earphones. A water tank was installed on the roof due to the addition of two bathrooms. As the formation for the Ōzora service in 1961 did not connect these cars to the dining car, all cars from 43 onwards added a bridge between carriages, and all other cars were modified in the same way. In addition, all cars from 48 onwards had a changed bogie.	
KiShi 80	1–37	3	It is almost similar to the 151, 481 and 489 series dining cars, but with a few differences; the water tank is mounted on the floor, reducing the capacity to 32 passengers. In addition, the number of windows in the dining room and kitchen aisles was reduced by one block each, and the men's restroom and the doors for business use were installed closer to the center of the car. Initially, a carriage position indicator was installed on these cars, but these were removed when the cars were transferred to other lines. The last car (37) had larger windows in the dining room and Venetian blinds. Furthermore, an additional engine was installed. Cars 29 (which would be converted to a 500-series car for the Tomamu Sahoro Express in 1988), 36 and 37 would be transferred to JR Hokkaido in 1987, whilst the cars that were operating on Ōtori and Okhotsk services were replaced by KiHa 183 series sets in October 1986. All cars were scrapped by June 6, 2007.	

=== Joyful Trains ===
In the 1980s, a number of Joyful Trains were built, which included the Furano Express, the Tomamu Sahoro Express and the Resort Liner.

==== Furano Express (KiHa 84 series) ====
Furano Express (フラノエクスプレス)
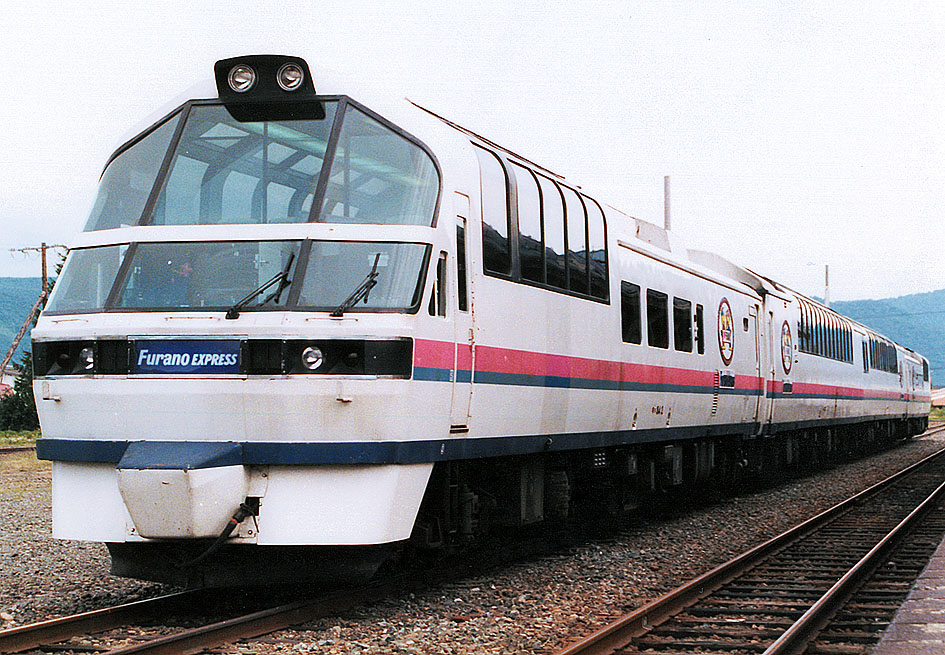
- Furano Express set
- In service: 1986–1998
- Refurbished: 1986–1987
- Scrapped: 2004
- Number scrapped: 4 cars

Specifications
- Maximum speed: 100 km/h (62 mph)

Due to the popularity of the Alpha Continental Express, which was a modified KiHa 56 series car that entered service in 1985, the Furano area, which was attracting attention as a tourist destination, demanded a set that offered high-quality service and improved ride comfort and speed. The set won the 30th Blue Ribbon Award in 1987.

From June to October 1987, as part of a collaboration with All Nippon Airways, the front destination board was changed to ANA, the train was reliveried with a band that had two shades of blue (which was similar to that on ANA aircraft), and the train's name was changed to the ANA Big Sneaker Train.

The KiHa 184-11 car was added to augment the set to 5 cars in January 1990. Modifications included a new control circuit, new hood height, and new exterior paint color. The car was removed from the formation later that year and restored to its usual configuration, and would eventually be scrapped in March 1994 due to damage sustained in an accident on an Ōzora service in February that year. The set was withdrawn after the Last Run Furano service on November 1, 1998, and scrapped on September 27, 2004.

Classification	Car nos.	No. built	Notes	Picture	Ref.
KiHa 84	1–2	2	An end power car equipped with two engines, it had a raised section of seats for an observation deck, alongside a non-raised general section. The circuit voltage was lowered from 100 V AC to 24 V DC to enable joint working with KiHa 183 series trains. Rebuilt from the KiHa 80-164 and 80-165 cars in December 1986.		
KiHa 83	1	1	An intermediate power car equipped with one engine, it had an observation deck. Rebuilt from KiHa 82-109 in December 1986.		
KiHa 80-500	1	1	An intermediate power car equipped with two engines, it had a lounge. Rebuilt from KiHa 82-110 and came into service in May 1987.		

==== Tomamu Sahoro Express (KiHa 84-100 series) ====
Tomamu Sahoro Express (トマムサホロエクスプレス)
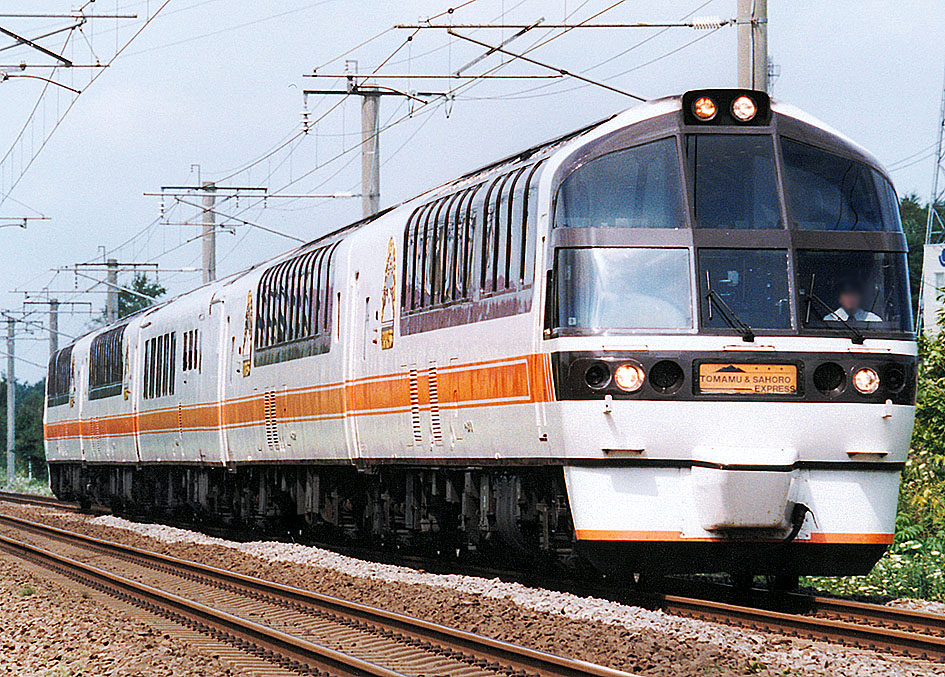
- Tomamu Sahoro Express set
- In service: 1987–2002
- Constructed: 1987–1988
- Scrapped: 2004–2007
- Number scrapped: 5 cars

Specifications
- Maximum speed: 100 km/h (62 mph)

Three cars (KiHa 84-101, KiHa 83-101 and KiHa 83-102) were completed on December 10, 1987. It began operating as a three-car set between Sapporo and Tomamu on December 27, 1987, immediately after its completion. In some seasons, it was operated as the Lavender Express to complement the Furano Express.

In 1988, two further cars (KiHa 83-102 and KiShi 80-501) were added to the set, augmenting it to five cars.

As part of a 1989 event in Shikoku called the Joyful Train Gathering of Six JR Companies, the train ran between Takamatsu and Matsuyama (where it was put on temporary display) on November 4, and on November 5, it ran between Matsuyama and Tadotsu. It returned to Hokkaido via the Tokaido and Tohoku Main Lines from November 6 to 10 under locomotive power from Tadotsu.

In 1999, the train was converted from a Seasun to the Mount Lake Onuma service, named after the Ōnuma Quasi-National Park's titular lake, and again to the Night Cruise Ryobi, which travelled via the former Esashi Line. It was restored to the Tomamu Sahoro Express paint scheme after these services ended in August 2002, and was used on weekend services from September 14 to October 14 of the same year. After that, the cars were withdrawn, and were eventually scrapped in 2004 (with the exception of KiShi 80-501, which would be scrapped in 2007).

Resort Liner (リゾートライナー)
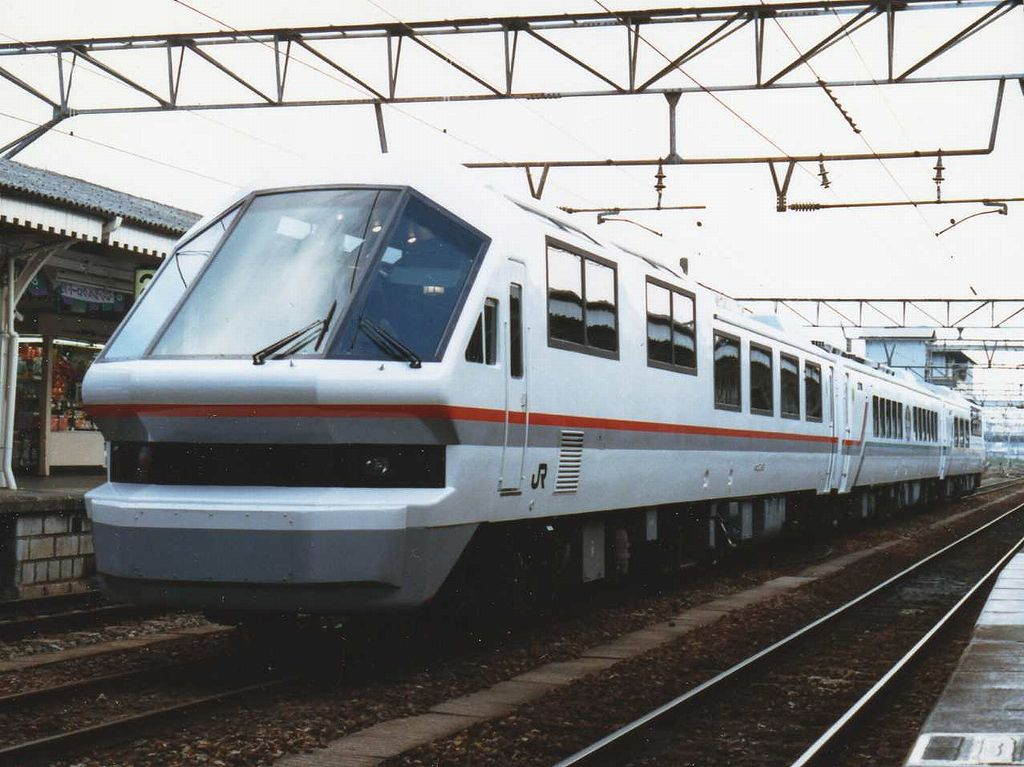
- Resort Liner set, 1989
- In service: 1988–1995
- Constructed: 1988
- Scrapped: 1995
- Number scrapped: 3 cars

Specifications
- Maximum speed: 100 km/h (62 mph)

==== Resort Liner (KiRo 82-800 series) ====
This 3-car train was completed on July 29, 1988, and began commercial operation on August 16, 1988. Unlike the other joyful trains based on this series, they were to be used for special trains and group trains that were scheduled on a case-by-case basis. In addition, some of the trains were operated in conjunction with express trains of the KiHa 58 and KiHa 65 series. For this reason, the jumper couplers for the control circuits were replaced. The cars would eventually be scrapped in 1995.

Classification	Car nos.	No. built	Notes	Ref.
KiRo 82-800	1	1	A front power car that was converted from the KiHa 82-99 car, it had a capacity of 24 passengers; it was equipped with four private rooms that could seat six people each, along with a lounge that had a microwave and refrigerator.	
KiRo 80-700	1	1	An intermediate car that was converted from the KiRo 80-57 car, it could accommodate 44 passengers; it was equipped with a stage alongside four rows of reclining seats in front and behind it, along with an audiovisual system and monitors.	
KiRo 80-800	1	1	An end power car that was converted from the KiHa 80-96 car, it could accommodate 44 passengers; the front half of the car is a high-decker section with seats that had inbuilt TVs, whilst the back half had six private rooms that could seat four people each. It also had a bathroom, along with a luggage storage area.	

== Preserved cars ==
KiHa 81-3
It was formerly preserved and exhibited at the Modern Transportation Museum in Osaka, before being moved to the Kyoto Railway Museum upon the former's closure in April 2014.

KiHa 82-101
It has been stored on the Hakkōda Maru.

KiHa 82-100, KiHa 80-150, Kishi 80-27, Kiro 80-52, Kiha 80-145, Kiha 82-87
Preserved in Mikasa, Hokkaido in the Mikasa Railway Village as a set.

KiHa 80 31
Preserved in Mikasa, Hokkaido in the Mikasa Railway Village as the restruant Kitchen Poronai.

Kiha 82-1, Kishi 80-12, Kishi 80-34
Preserved in Otaru, Hokkaido in a museum. Due to outdoors preservation, the set's condition is deteriorating.

Kiha 82-73
Preserved in the SCMaglev and Railway Park in Nagoya.

Kiha 82-86
Preserved in JR Hokkaido's Naebo Workshop inside the Hokkaido Railway Technology Museum. Cab end only, as the rest of the car was converted to the middle car of Tonamu & Sahono Express.

Preserved cars
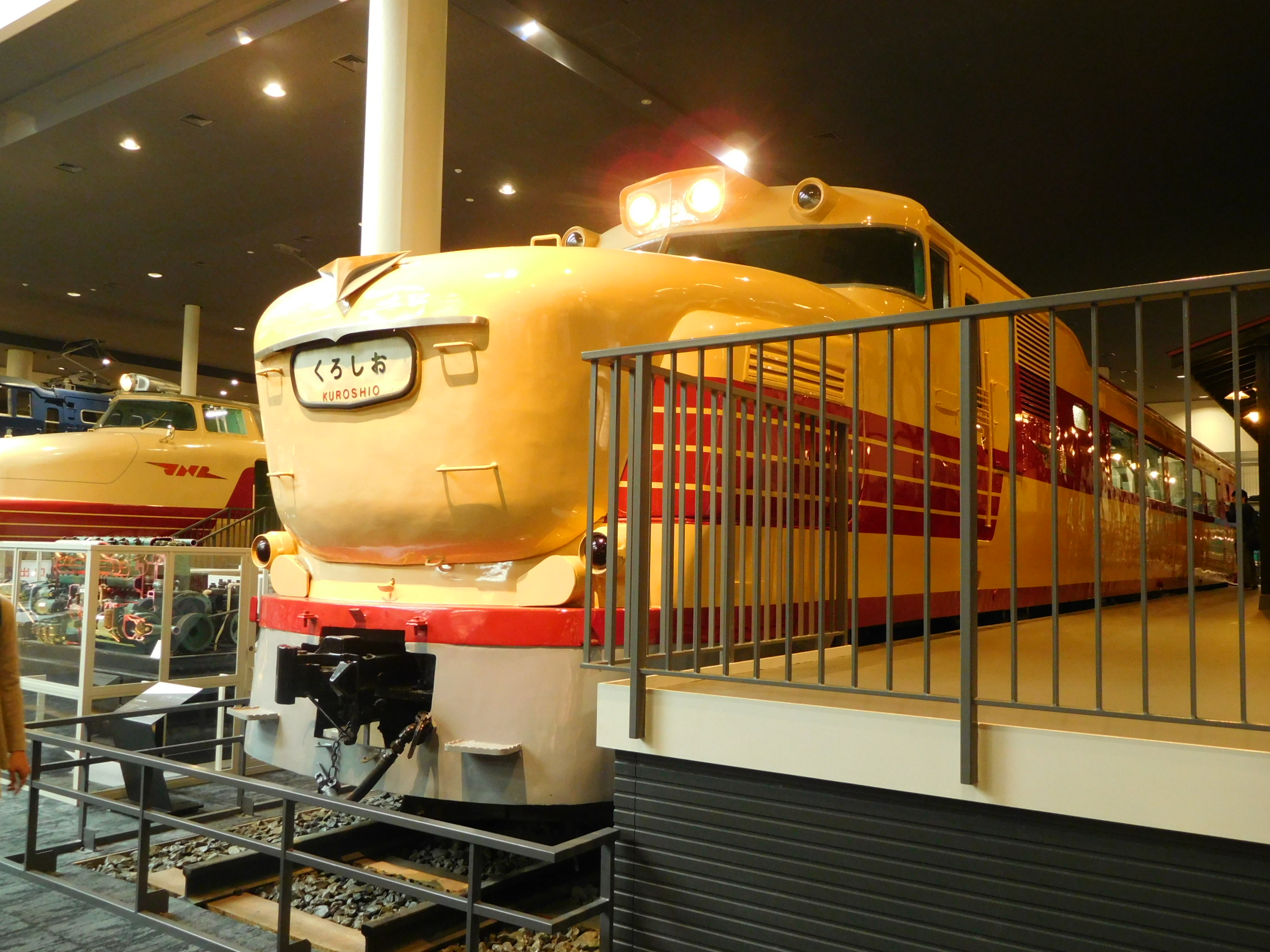
KiHa 81-3 car at the Kyoto Railway Museum

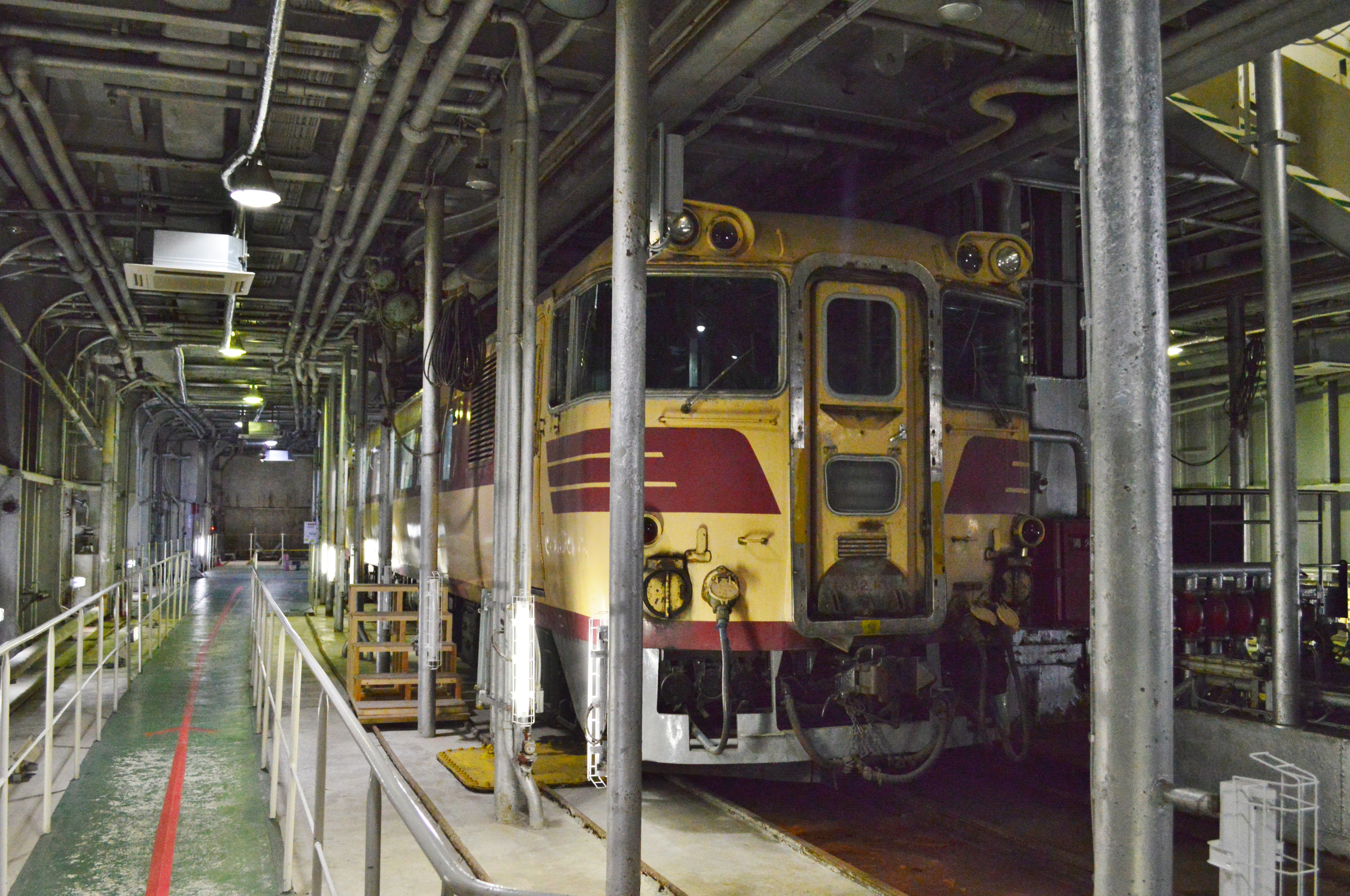
Front of KiHa 82-101 on the Hakkōda Maru, 2014

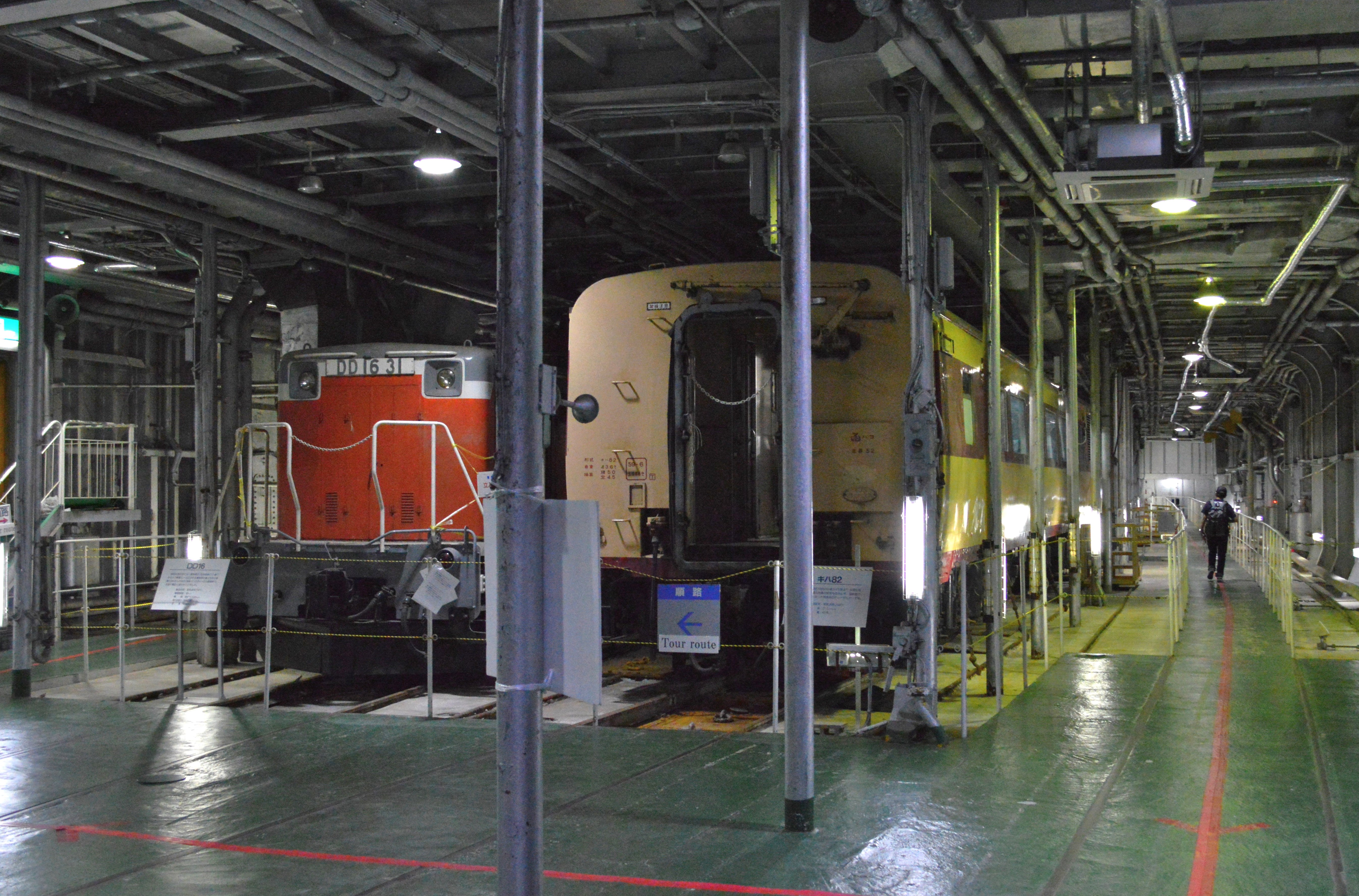
Back of KiHa 82-101 on the Hakkōda Maru, 2014

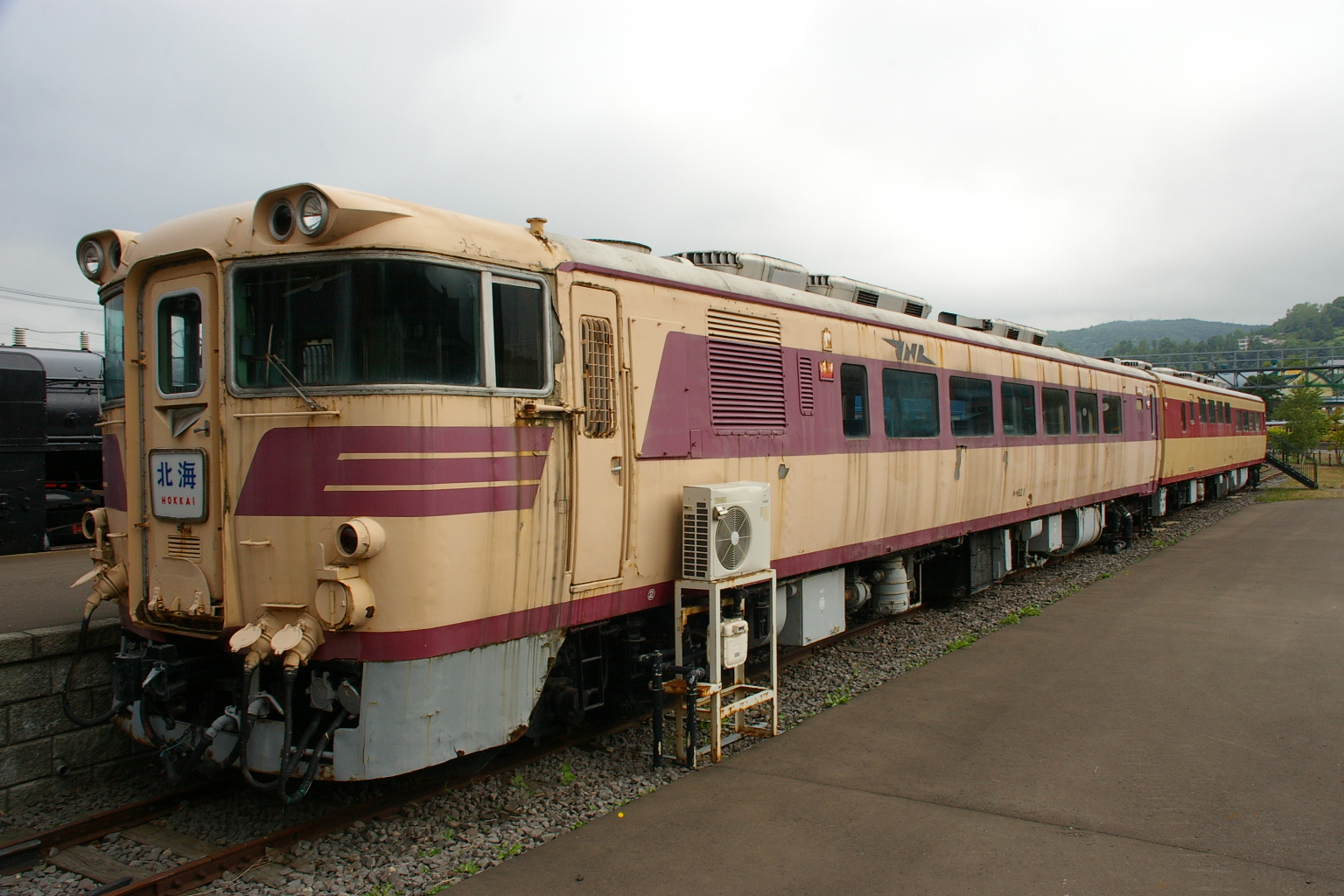
Kiha 82-1 and Kishi 80-34 in Otaru
