= E751 series =

Japanese train type

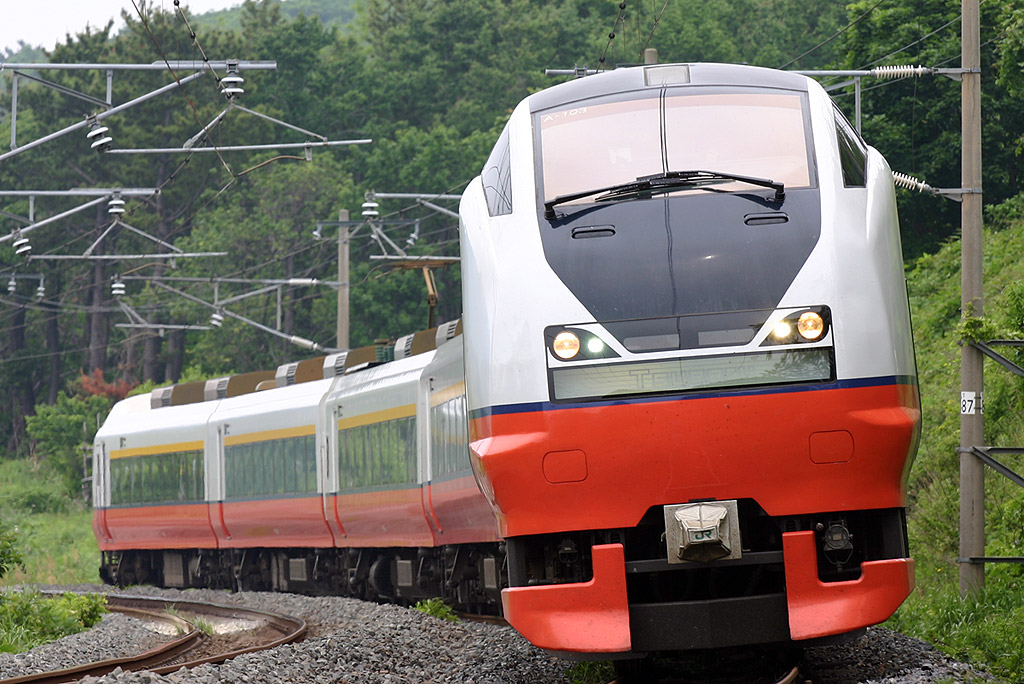
- An E751 series 6-car set on a Tsugaru service in June 2006
- In service: March 2000–Present
- Manufacturer: Tokyu Car Corporation
- Built at: Yokohama
- Replaced: 485 series
- Constructed: 1999–2000
- Number built: 18 vehicles (3 sets)
- Number in service: 12 vehicles (3 sets)
- Number scrapped: 6 vehicles
- Formation: 4 cars per trainset
- Fleet numbers: A101–A103
- Operator: JR East
- Depot: Aomori
- Line served: Ōu Main Line

Specifications
- Car body construction: Aluminium alloy
- Car length: 21 m (68 ft 11 in) (end cars); 20.5 m (67 ft 3 in) (intermediate cars)
- Width: 2,976 mm (9 ft 9.2 in)
- Floor height: 1,140 mm (3 ft 9 in)
- Doors: 1 per side
- Maximum speed: 130 km/h (80 mph)
- Traction system: PWM 3-level IGBT-VVVF (Hitachi)
- Traction motors: 4 × Hitachi MT72 145 kW (194 hp) 3-phase AC squirrel-cage asynchronous induction motor
- Power output: 2.32 MW (3,110 hp)
- Electric system: 20 kV 50 Hz AC overhead line
- Current collection: Pantograph
- Bogies: DT64A (motored), TR249A (trailer)
- Safety system: ATS-Ps
- Track gauge: 1,067 mm (3 ft 6 in)

The E751 series (E751系) is an AC electric multiple unit (EMU) train type operated on Tsugaru limited express services in the north of Japan by East Japan Railway Company (JR East) since March 2000. The design was based on the earlier (1,500 V DC) E653 series EMUs, with improvements to cope with colder weather conditions in the north of Japan.

== Formations ==
=== 4-car sets (April 2011–Present) ===
The original six-car sets were shortened to four cars as shown below from 23 April 2011. The sets were occasionally lengthened to six cars for increased capacity during busy periods by inserting a pair of MoHa E751 and MoHa E750 cars until the three pairs of MoHa E751 and MoHa E750 cars were withdrawn in 2015.

Car No.	1	2	3	4
Designation	Thsc	M1	M2	Tc
Numbering	KuRoHa E750	MoHa E751-100	MoHa E750-100	KuHa E751
Weight (t)	30.7	34.8	33.1	29.0
Capacity	38 (16 Grn + 22 Std)	72		68

Car 2 is equipped with one PS107 single-arm pantograph.

=== 6-car sets (March 2000–April 2011) ===
Sets were originally formed as six-car sets, consisting of four motored cars and two trailers, as shown below. Sets were shortened to four cars from 23 April 2011.

Car No.	1	2	3	4	5	6
Designation	Tc1	M2	M1	M2	M1	Tsc'
Numbering	KuHa E751	MoHa E750-100	MoHa E751-100	MoHa E750	MoHa E751	KuRoHa E750
Weight (t)	29.0	33.1	34.8	33.1	34.8	30.7
Capacity	68	72				38 (16 Grn + 22 Std)

Cars 3 and 5 are each equipped with one PS107 single-arm pantograph.

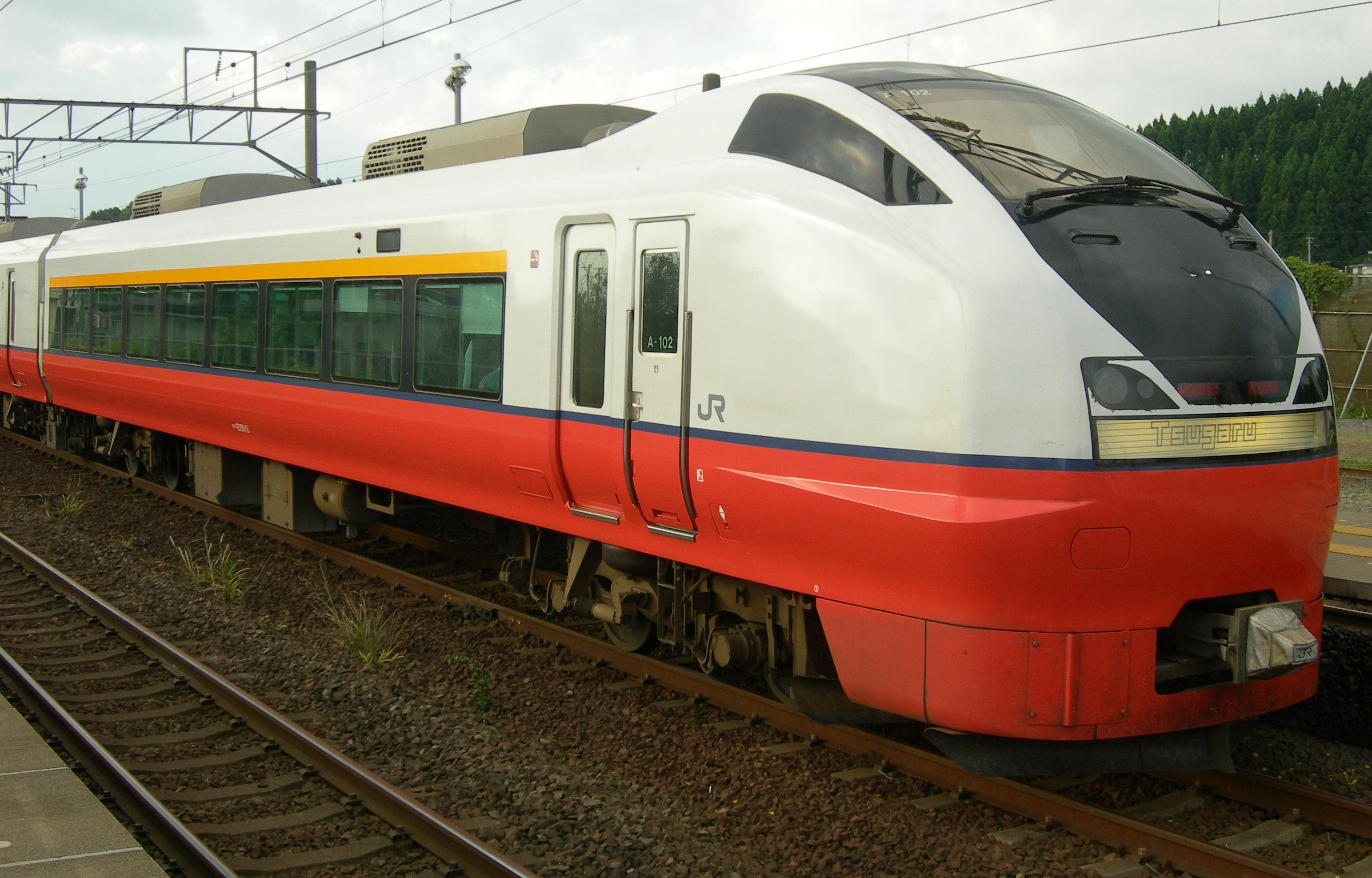
KuHa E751

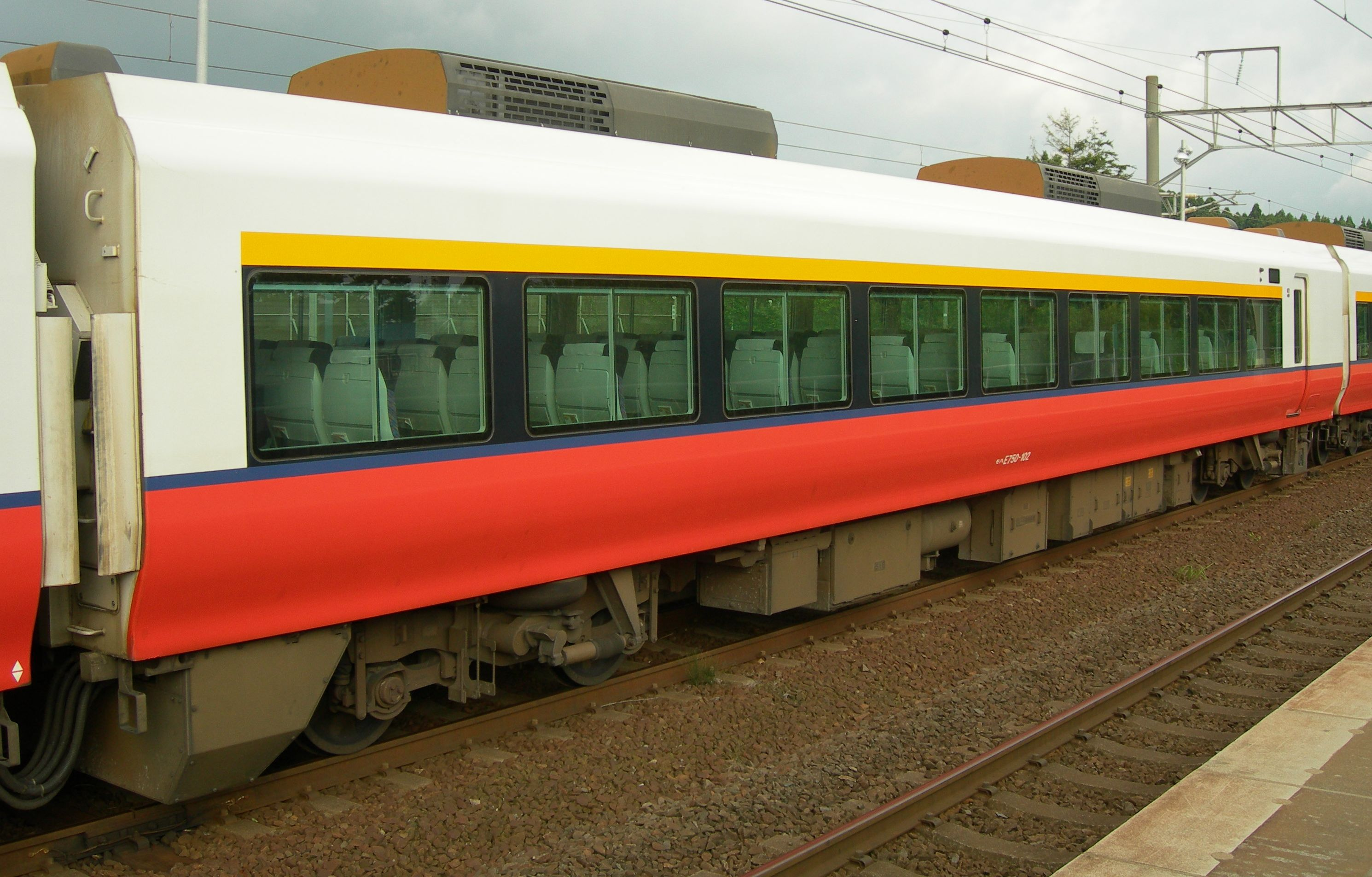
MoHa E750-100

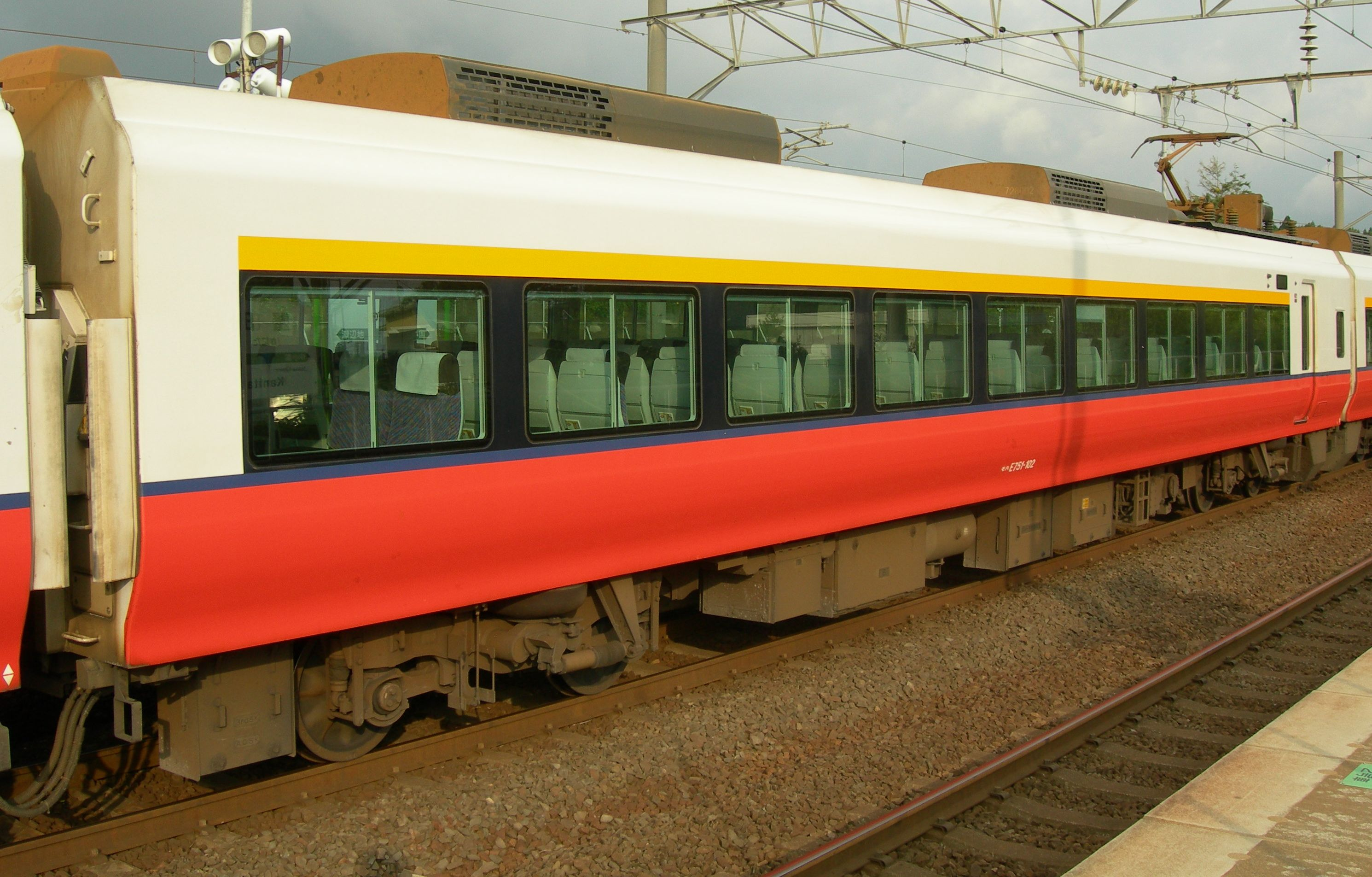
MoHa E751-100

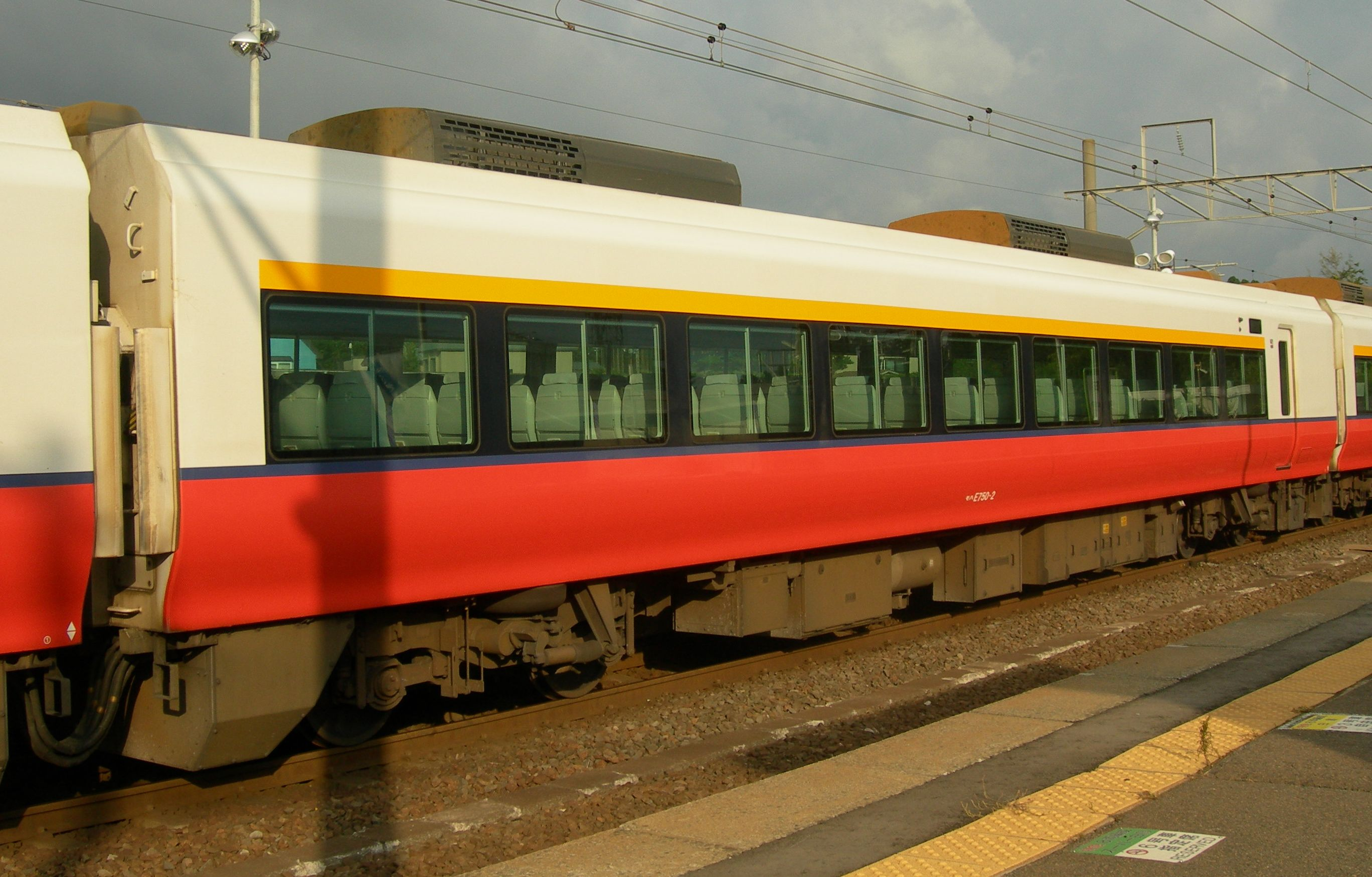
MoHa E750

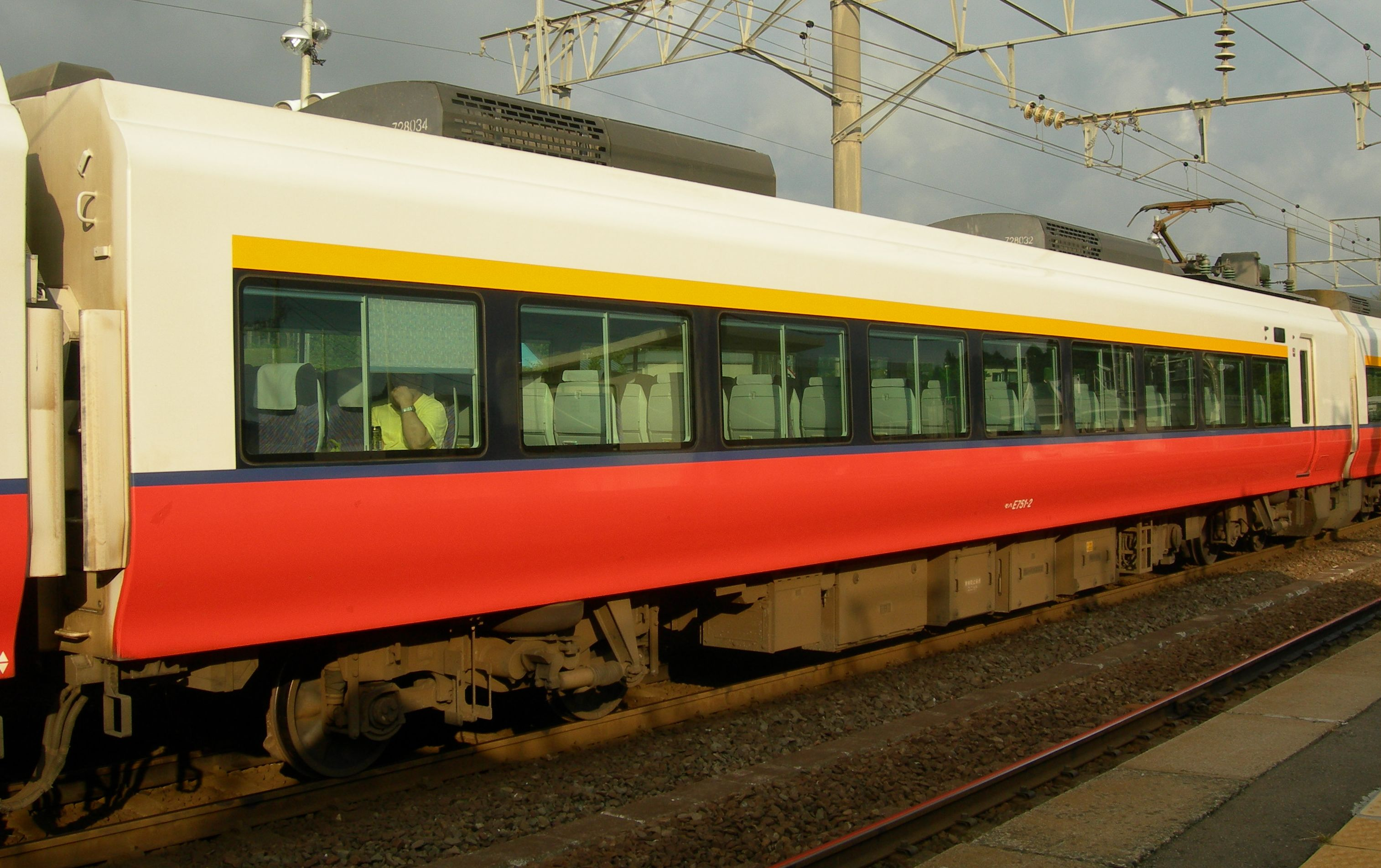
MoHa E751

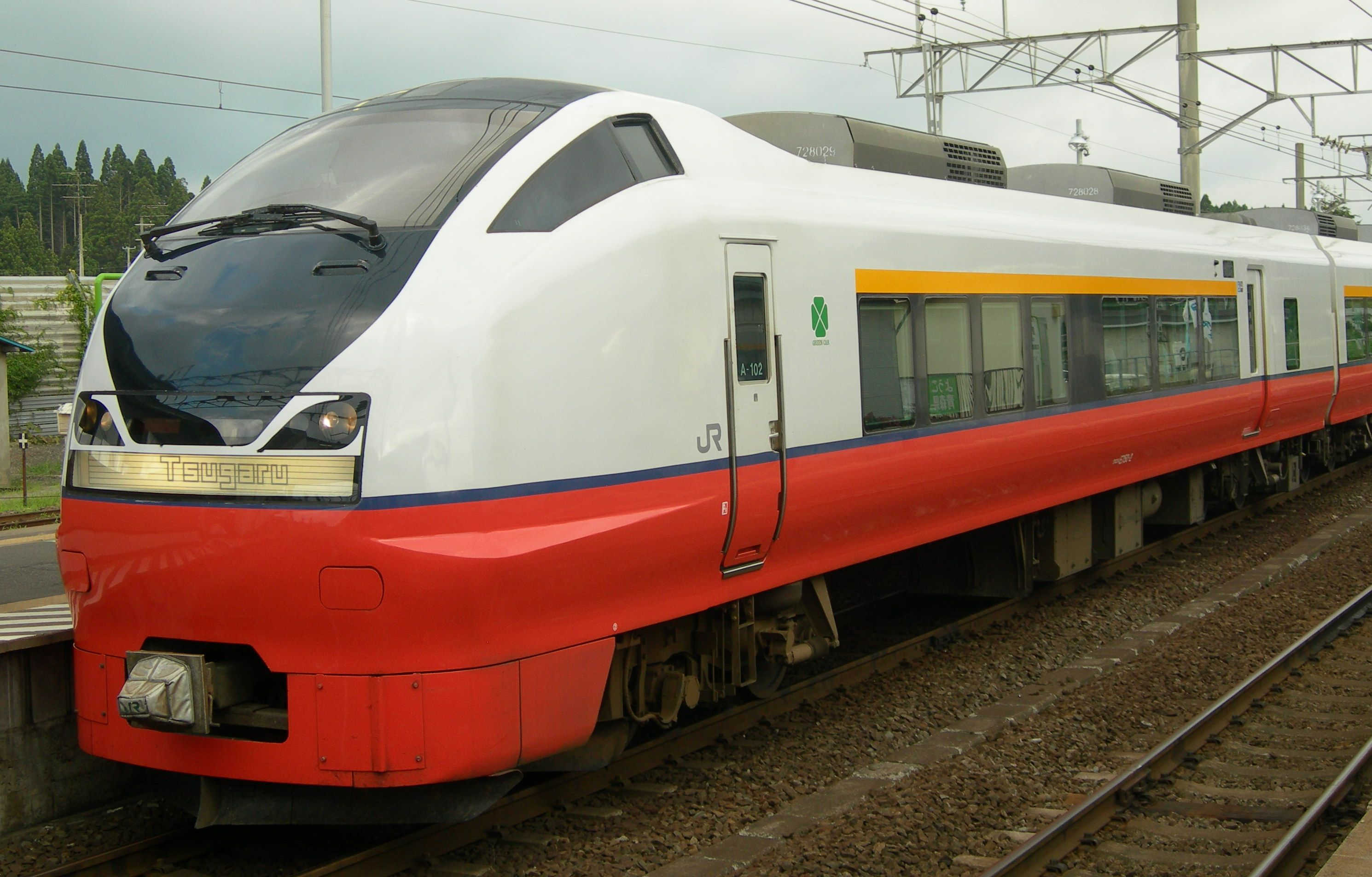
KuRoHa E750

== Interior ==
Seating is configured 2+2 abreast in both standard class and Green class. Seat pitch is 910 mm (36 in) in standard class and 1,160 mm (46 in) in Green class.

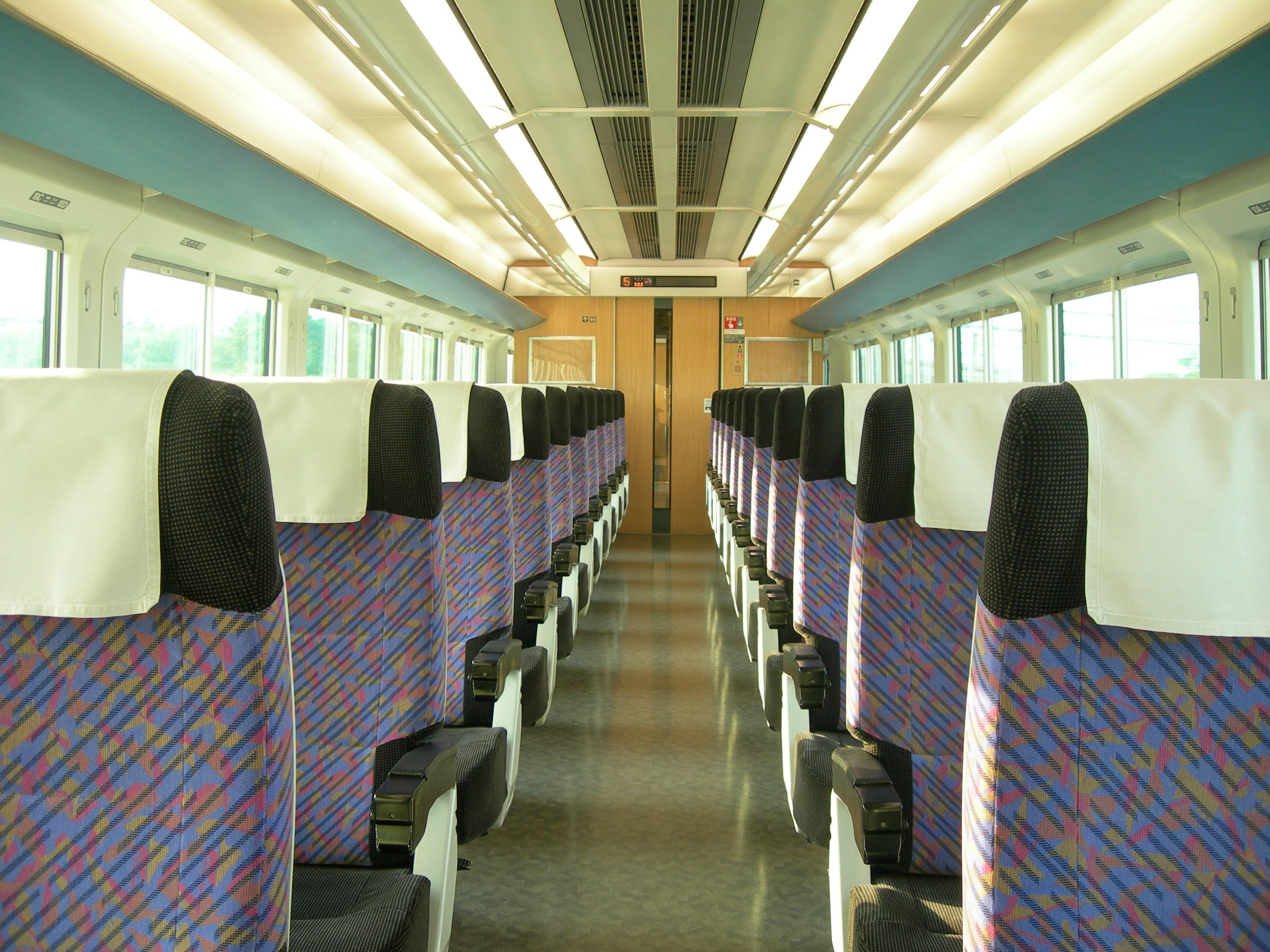
Standard-class accommodation (MoHa E750-100)

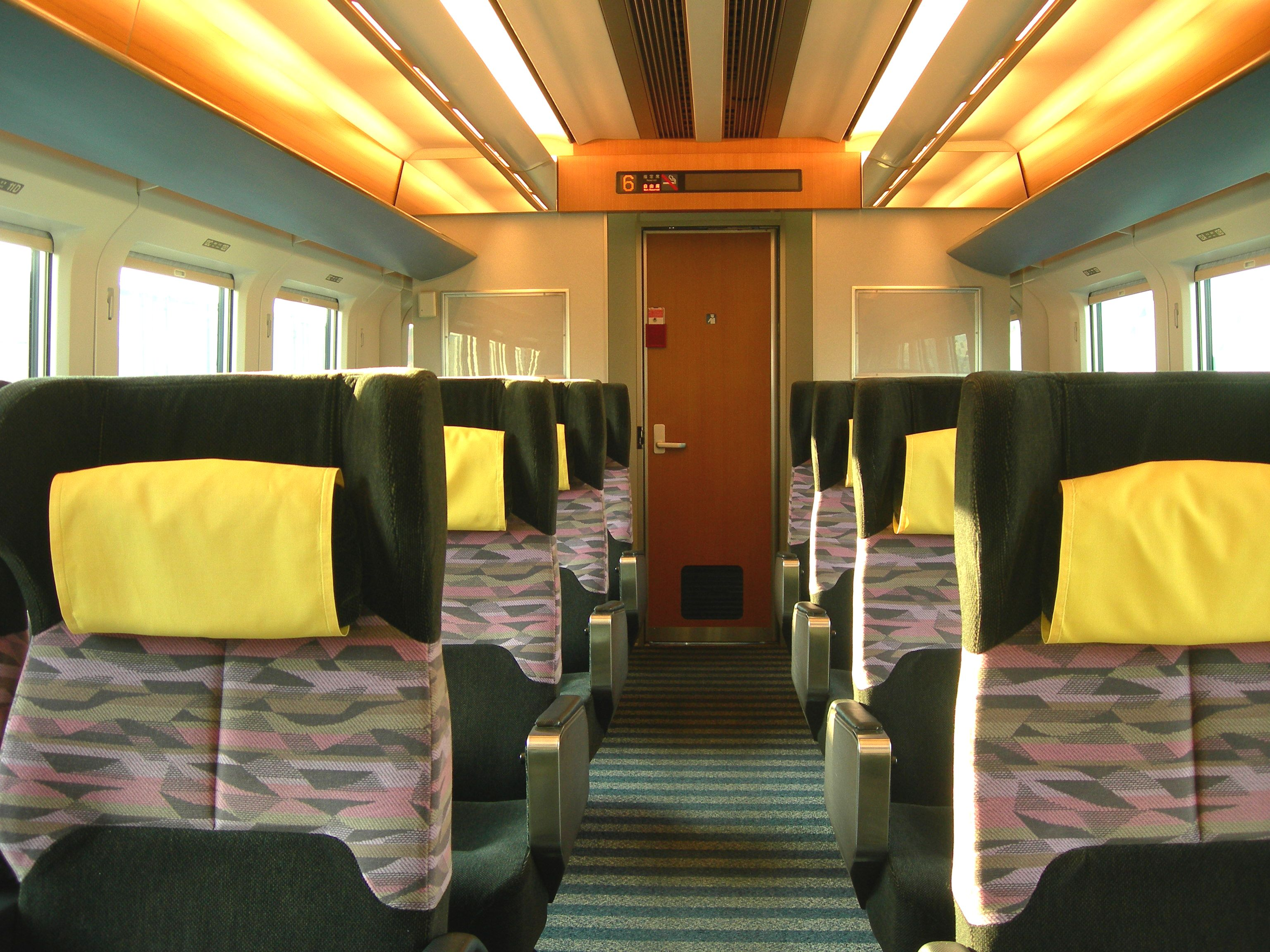
Green-class accommodation (KuRoHa E750)

== History ==
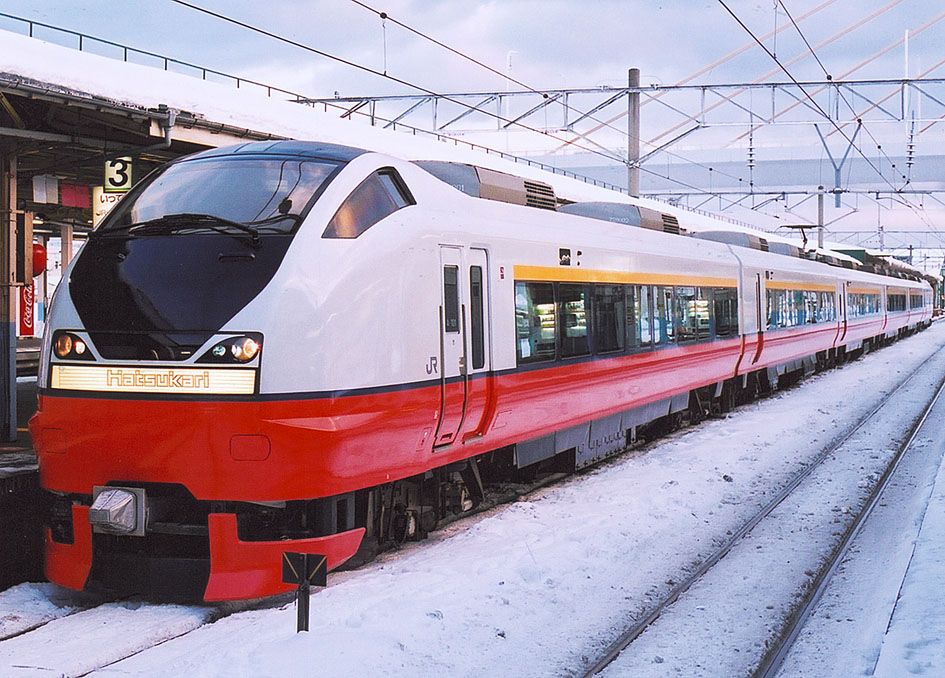
An E751 series EMU at Aomori Station on a Super Hatsukari service in 2002

The first set was delivered to Aomori Depot from Tokyu Car Corporation's Yokohama factory on 9 December 1999, followed by the remaining two sets in January 2000. The fleet entered service on Super Hatsukari services operating between Morioka and Aomori from the start of the revised timetable on 11 March 2000.

From 1 December 2002, the E751 series trains were reassigned to new Tsugaru services operating between Hachinohe and Hirosaki, which replaced the former Super Hatsukari services following the opening of the Tōhoku Shinkansen extension from Morioka to Hachinohe.

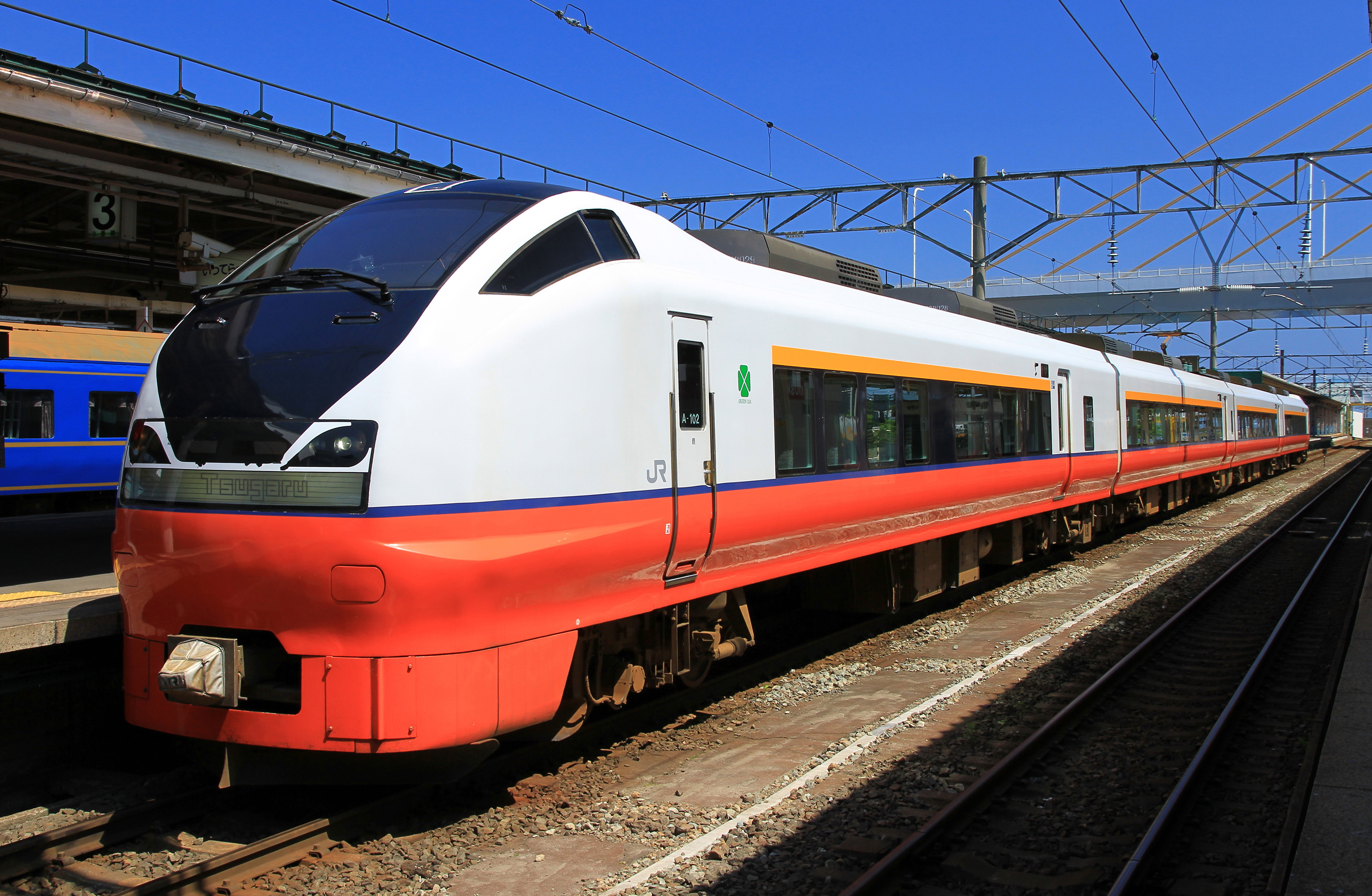
A 4-car E751 series EMU at Aomori Station in July 2011, showing modified front end snowplough

In late 2006, all three sets underwent modifications at JR East's Kōriyama Works to reinforce the front end snowploughs and add protection plates to underfloor equipment.

From the start of 4 December 2010 timetable revision, the E751 series sets were replaced on Tsugaru services by 4-car 485-3000 series EMUs, and were temporarily removed from regular service. From 23 April 2011, the fleet of three E751 series sets were reinstated on Tsugaru services, this time formed as 4-car sets, replacing the 485-3000 series sets. The three pairs of MoHa E751 and MoHa E750 cars removed were stored at Aomori Depot, and occasionally reinserted into sets to provide increased capacity during busy seasons until the three pairs of cars were withdrawn in 2015.

== Build details ==
The build details for the three sets are as follows.

Set No.	Manufacturer	Date delivered
A101	Tokyu Car	9 December 1999
A102	Tokyu Car	12 January 2000
A103	Tokyu Car	27 January 2000
