= Hatsukari =

Japanese limited express train services

Hatsukari Super Hatsukari
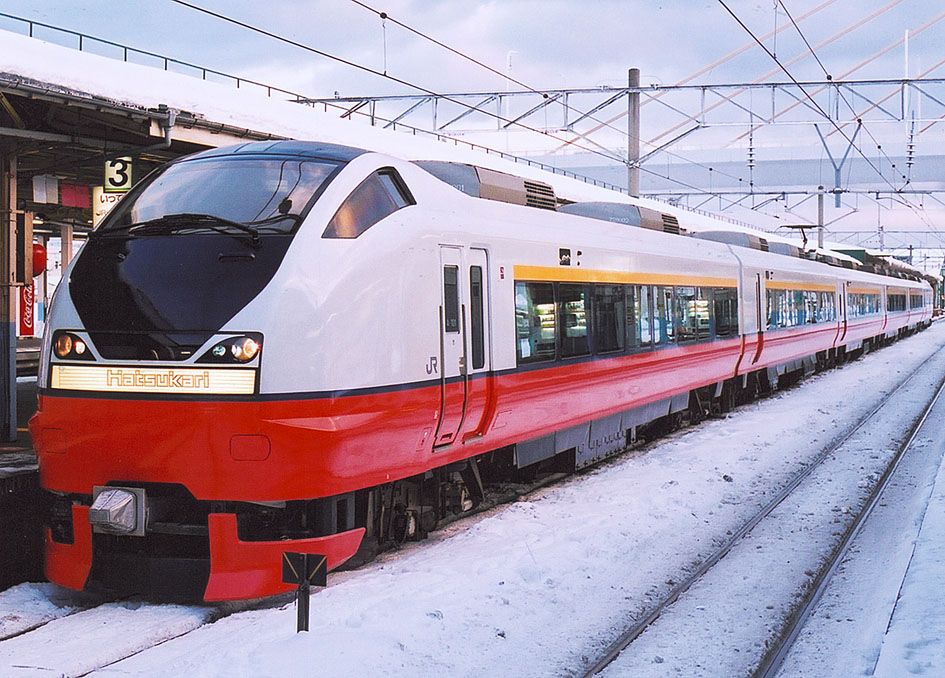
- E751 series EMU on a Super Hatsukari service, 2002

Overview
- Service type: Limited express
- Status: Discontinued
- Locale: Tohoku region, Japan
- First service: 1 October 1958 (Hatsukari); 18 March 2000 (Super Hatsukari)
- Last service: 30 November 2002
- Successor: Super Hakuchō
- Former operator(s): JNR; JR East

Route
- Termini: Morioka; Hakodate
- Line(s) used: Tōhoku Main Line; Tsugaru-Kaikyo Line

Technical
- Rolling stock: 485 series, E751 series EMUs
- Track gauge: 1,067 mm (3 ft 6 in)
- Electrification: 20 kV AC, 50 Hz overhead
- Operating speed: 140 km/h (85 mph)

The Hatsukari (はつかり) and Super Hatsukari (スーパーはつかり) were limited express train services in Japan operated by Japanese National Railways (JNR) and later East Japan Railway Company (JR East) from 1958 until 2002.

== History ==
The Hatsukari was first introduced on 1 October 1958 as a long-distance steam-hauled limited express service operating between Ueno in Tokyo and Aomori via the Jōban Line. From 1960, new KiHa 81 series diesel multiple units were introduced on the service, reducing the journey time to 10 hours 25 minutes. From 1 October 1968, the train was amended via the more direct Tōhoku Main Line using 583 series electric multiple units.

From 15 November 1982, with the opening of the Tōhoku Shinkansen to Morioka, the Hatsukari service was shortened to operate between Morioka and Aomori. This was extended to operate to Hakodate in Hokkaido from 13 March 1988, following the opening of the undersea Seikan Tunnel. The maximum speed was raised to 140 km/h (85 mph) through the Seikan Tunnel from 16 March 1991.

New E751 series electric multiple units were introduced from 18 March 2000, with the trains running as Morioka – Aomori Super Hatsukari alongside the Morioka – Hakodate Hatsukari services using 485-3000 series EMUs.

The Super Hatsukari and Hatsukari services were discontinued from the start of the revised timetable on 1 December 2002, with the opening of the Tōhoku Shinkansen extension to Hachinohe, and were superseded by new Hakuchō and Super Hakuchō services operating from Hachinohe to Hakodate. The E751 series EMUs were transferred to new Tsugaru limited express services operating between Hachinohe and Hirosaki.

== Rolling stock ==
- KiHa 81 series DMUs (1960 – 1968)
- 583 series EMUs (1 October 1968 – December 2002)
- 485 series 6-car EMUs (March 1973 – December 2002)
- 485-3000 series 6-car EMUs ( ? – December 2002)
- E751 series 6-car EMUs (Super Hatsukari, March 2000 – December 2002)
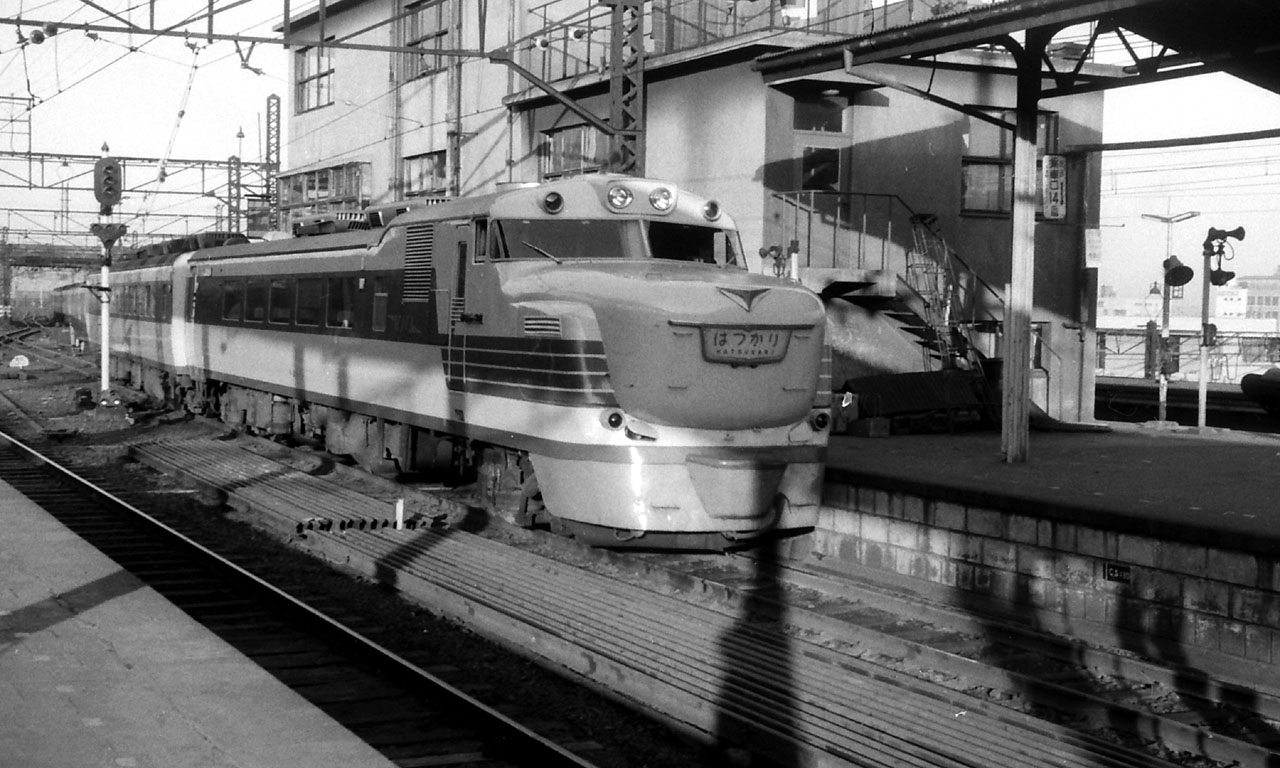
JNR KiHa 81 series DMU

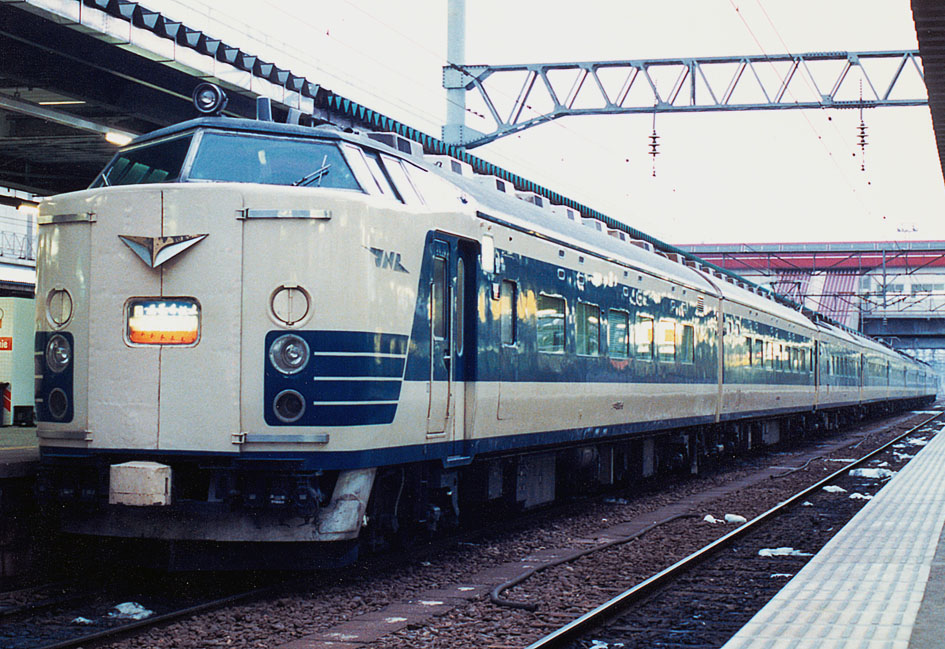
JNR 583 series EMU, 1987

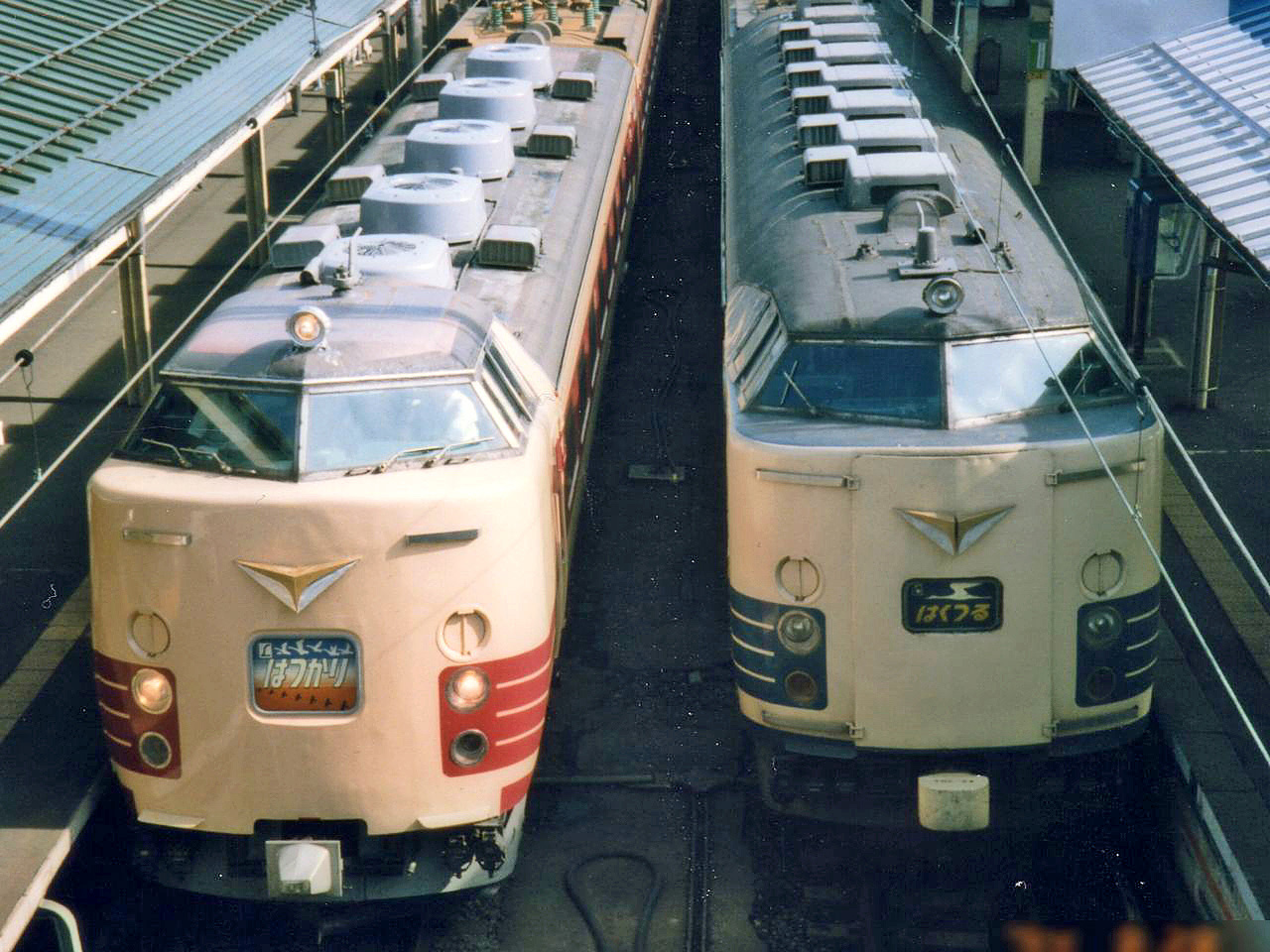
485 series EMU (left), August 1994

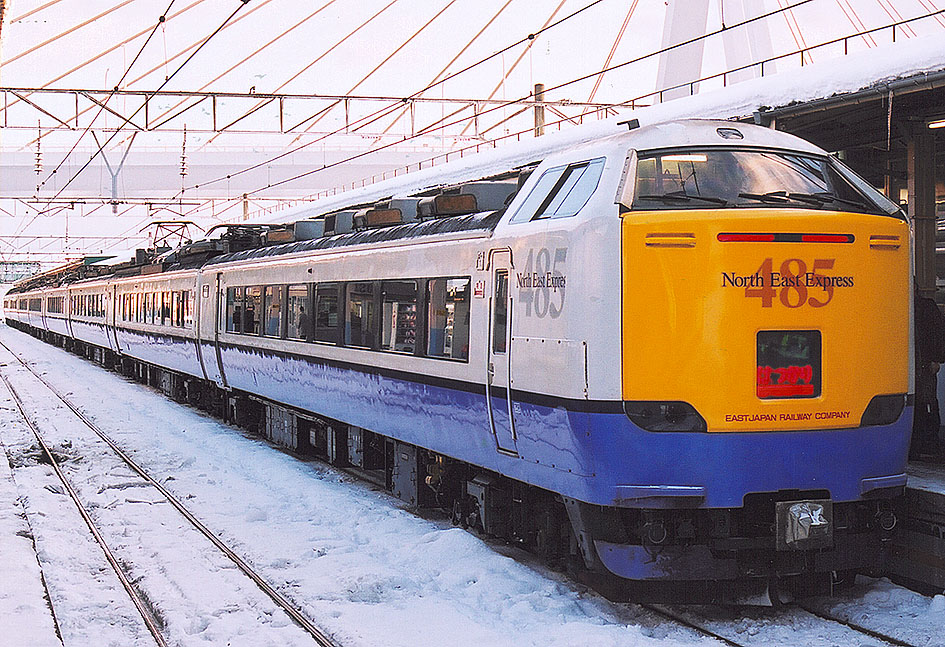
485-3000 series EMU, 2002

== See also ==
- List of named passenger trains of Japan
