= Tsugaru (train) =

Japanese limited express train service

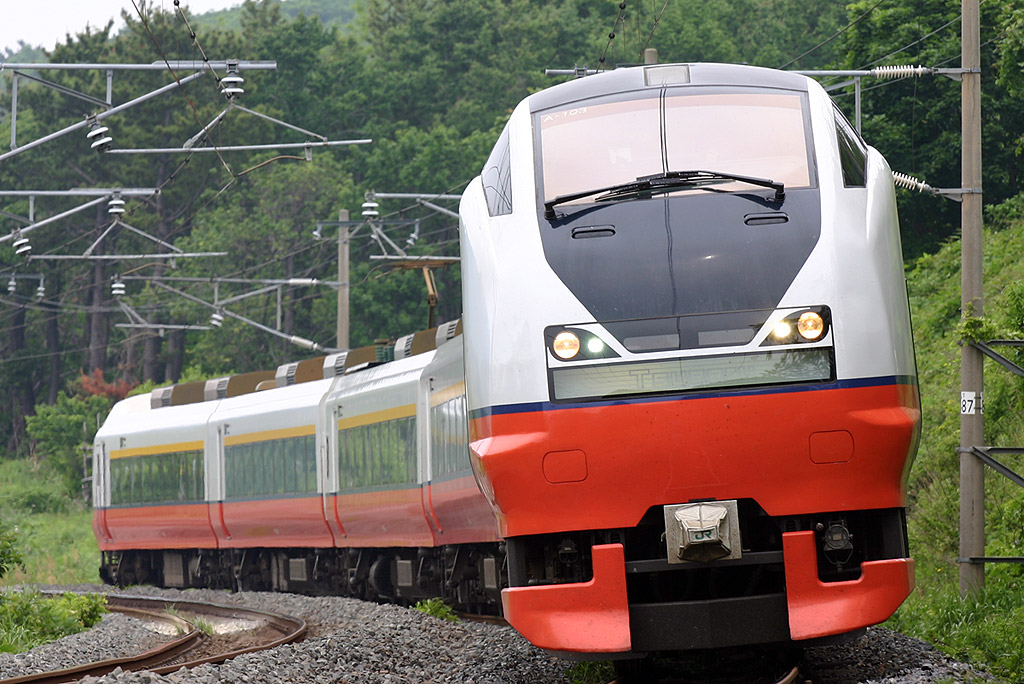
- An E751 series EMU on a Tsugaru service in June 2006

Overview
- Service type: Limited express
- Predecessor: Kamoshika
- First service: 1954 (Express); 2002 (Limited express)
- Current operator(s): JR East
- Former operator(s): JNR

Route
- Termini: Aomori; Akita
- Service frequency: 4 return services daily
- Line(s) used: Ōu Main Line

On-board services
- Class(es): Green + Standard

Technical
- Rolling stock: E751 series EMUs
- Track gauge: 1,067 mm (3 ft 6 in)
- Electrification: 20 kV AC (50 Hz) overhead
- Operating speed: 130 km/h (80 mph)

The Tsugaru (つがる) is a limited express train service in Japan operated by East Japan Railway Company (JR East), which runs from Aomori to Hirosaki and Akita via the Ōu Main Line.

== Service pattern ==
Four return workings operate daily between Aomori and Akita, with two return workings between Aomori and Ōdate during busy seasons.

Tsugaru services stop at the following stations:

Akita - Hachirōgata - Moritake - Higashi-Noshiro - Futatsui - Takanosu - Ōdate - Ikarigaseki - Ōwani-Onsen - Hirosaki - Namioka - Shin-Aomori - Aomori

== Rolling stock ==
Services are normally formed of 4-car E751 series electric multiple units (EMUs) based at Aomori depot, with Aomori-based 4-car 485-3000 series EMUs also used on some additional services during busy seasons.

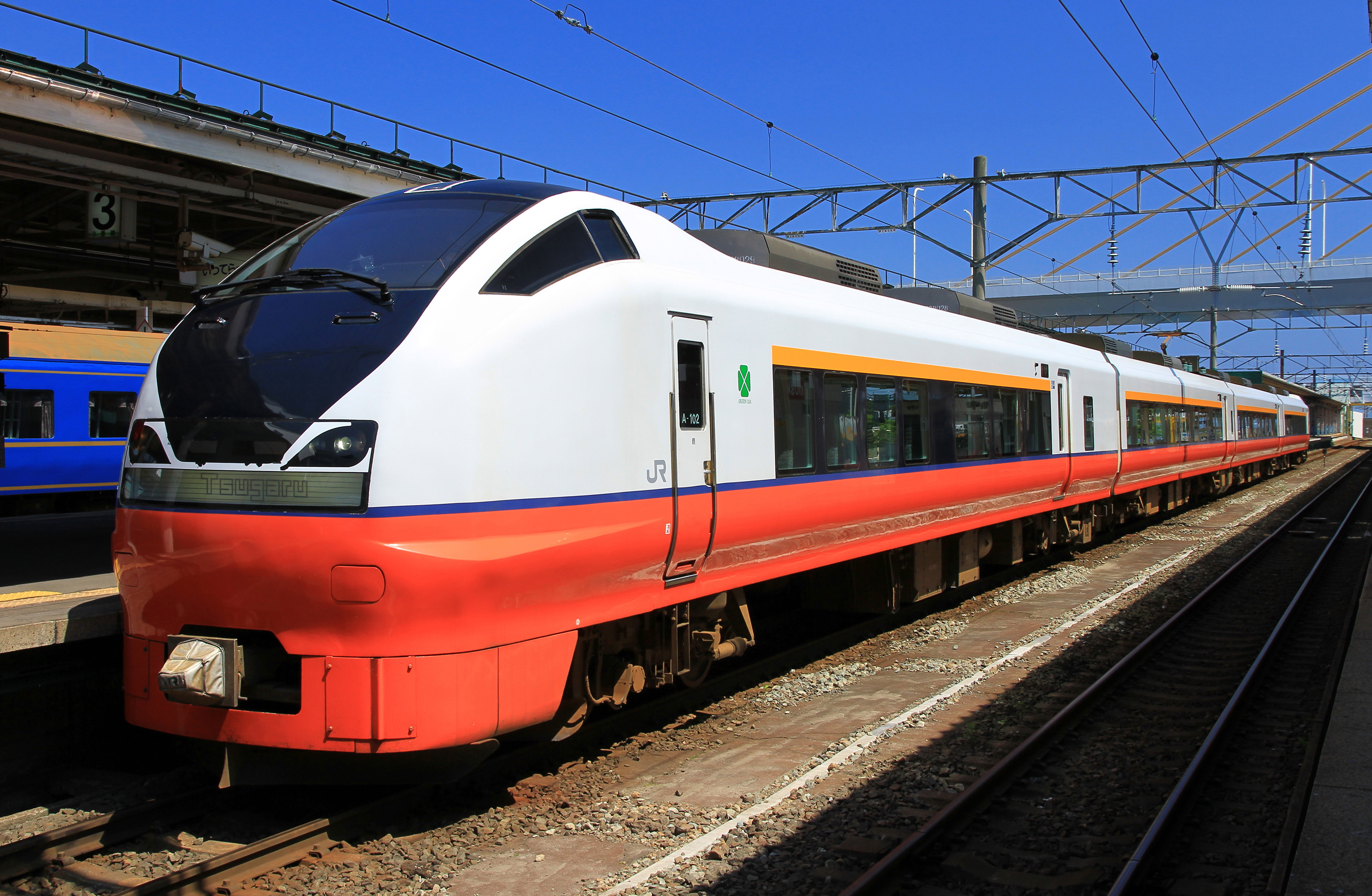
4-car E751 series EMU on a Tsugaru service, July 2011

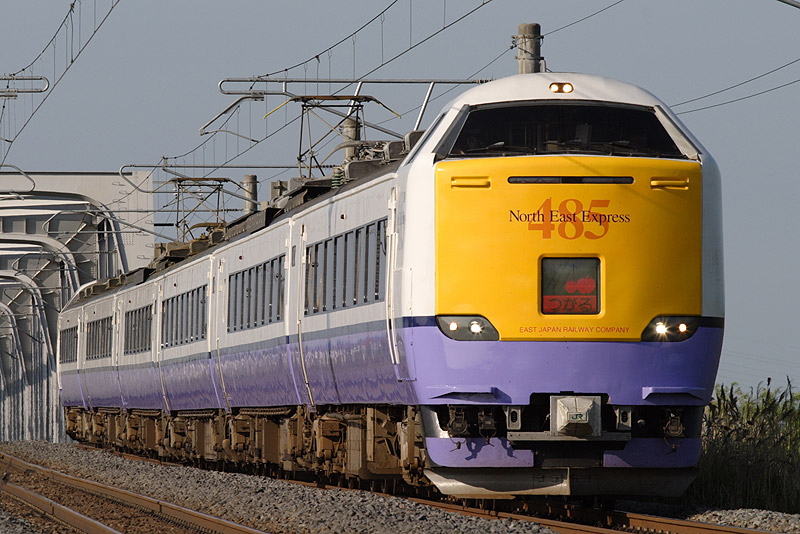
6-car 485-3000 series on a Tsugaru service, June 2007

== Formations ==
Trains are formed as shown below, with car 1 at the Akita end. All cars are no-smoking.

Car No.	1		2	3	4
Accommodation	Green	Reserved	Reserved	Non-reserved	Non-reserved
Facilities	Toilet			Toilet	

== History ==
The Tsugaru (津軽) was first introduced on 1 October 1954 as an express service operating between Ueno in Tokyo and Aomori via Niitsu and Akita. From 19 November 1956, the train was amended to run via Fukushima and Akita. This service was discontinued from the start of the revised timetable on 1 December 1993.

The Tsugaru name was revived from 1 December 2002 as a limited express service operating between Hachinohe and Hirosaki, superseding the former Hatsukari limited express service which ran between Morioka and Aomori up until the opening of the Tōhoku Shinkansen extension to Hachinohe. Services were formed of 6-car 485-3000 series and E751 series EMUs based at Aomori depot, with JR Hokkaido 789 series EMUs used on some services.

From 4 December 2010, with the opening of the Tōhoku Shinkansen extension from Hachinohe to Shin-Aomori, the Tsugaru services were amended to operate between Aomori and Akita, replacing the Kamoshika and Inaho services that previously ran on this route. From this date, services were formed of shortened 4-car 485-3000 series EMUs, with the E751 series EMUs temporarily removed from service.

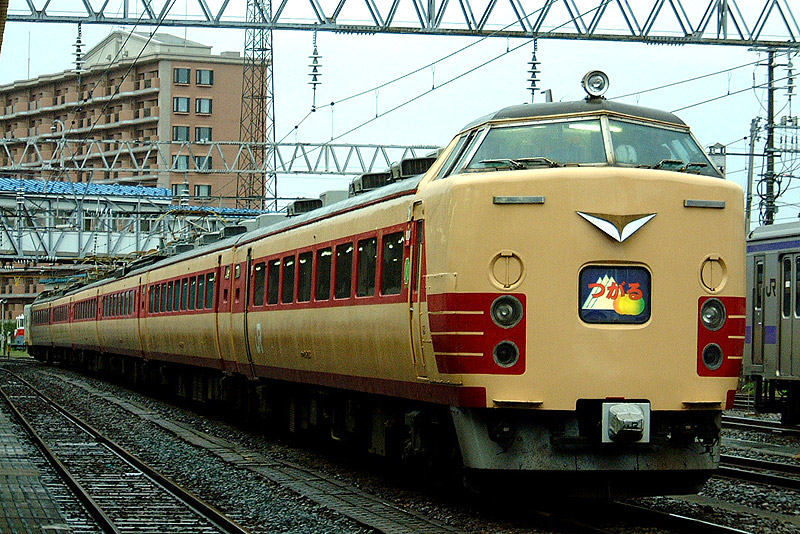
6-car 485 series EMU, August 2003

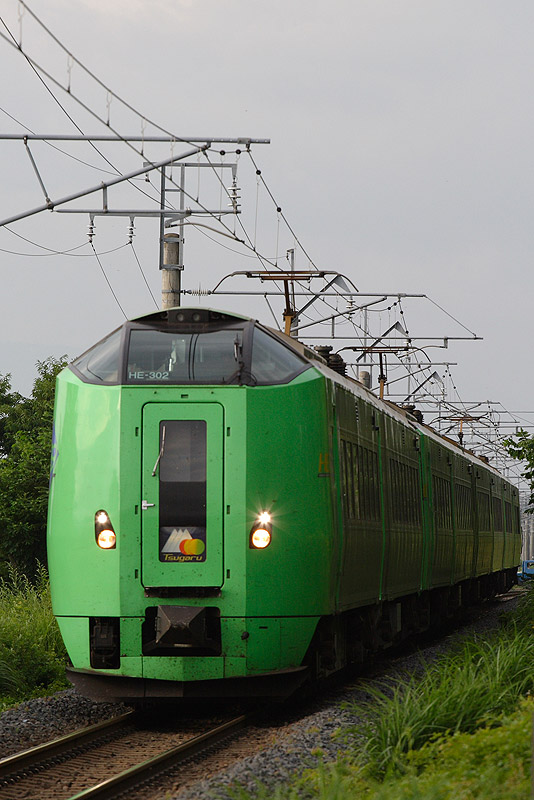
789 series EMU on a Tsugaru service, August 2007

From 23 April 2011, the E751 series sets were reinstated on Tsugaru services, this time formed as 4-car sets, replacing the 485-3000 series sets.
