= Kamoshika =

Japanese train service

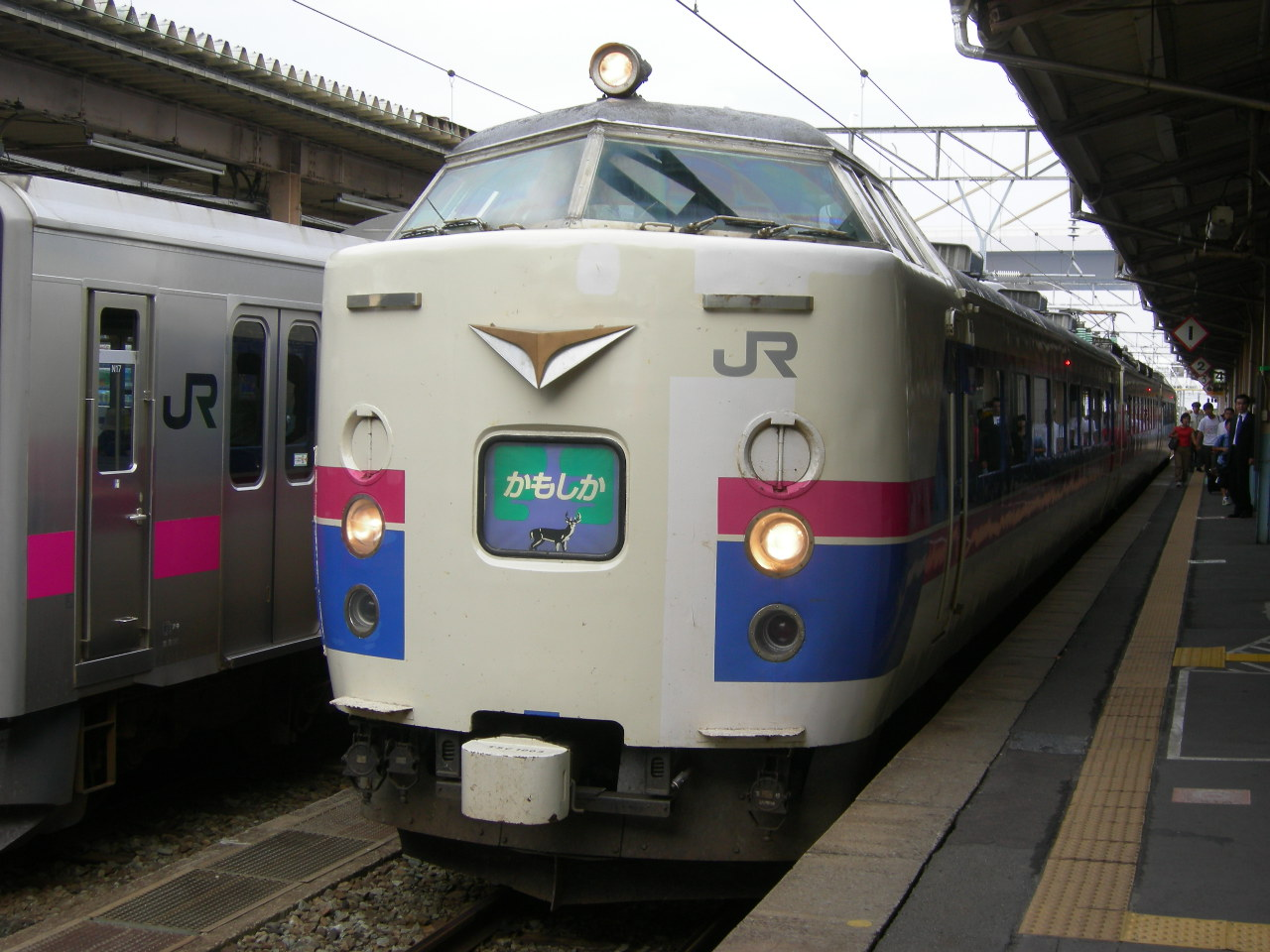
- A Kamoshika service at Aomori Station in September 2007

Overview
- Service type: Limited express
- Status: Discontinued
- First service: 1986 (Express); 1997 (Limited express)
- Last service: 2010
- Successor: Tsugaru
- Former operator(s): JNR; JR East

Route
- Termini: Akita; Aomori
- Distance travelled: 185.8 km (115.5 mi)
- Average journey time: 2 hours 36 minutes
- Service frequency: 6 daily
- Line(s) used: Ōu Main Line

On-board services
- Class(es): Green + standard

Technical
- Rolling stock: 485 series EMU
- Track gauge: 1,067 mm (3 ft 6 in)
- Electrification: 20 kV AC
- Operating speed: 95 km/h (60 mph)

The Kamoshika (かもしか, lit. "Japanese serow") was a limited express train service in Japan operated by East Japan Railway Company (JR East) which ran between Akita and Aomori via the Ōu Main Line. The service was discontinued from December 2010.

== Service pattern ==
There were three services in each direction daily.

== Rolling stock ==
Trains were normally formed of three-car 485 series EMUs based at Akita depot, sometimes strengthened to six cars during busy seasons. Green car (first class) accommodation was included in car 1.

The trains were formed as follows, with car 1 at the Akita end.

Car No.	1	2	3
Numbering	KuRoHa 481	MoHa 484	KuMoHa 485
Accommodation	Green/Ordinary	Ordinary	Ordinary

== History ==
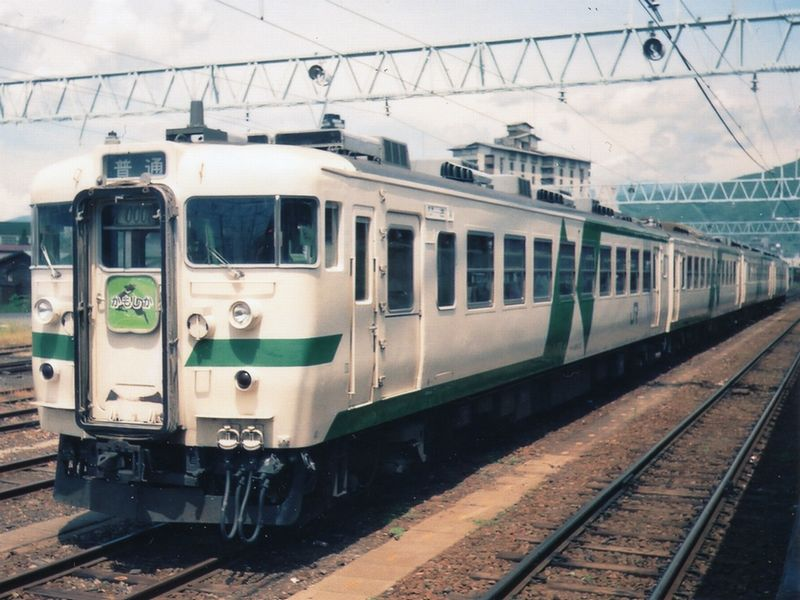
169 series EMU with Kamoshika express service headboard stabled at Kami-Suwa Station in 1987

The Kamoshika was first introduced on 1 November 1986 as an express service operating between Kami-Suwa, Iida, and Nagano. This service was discontinued from the start of the revised timetable on 13 March 1988.

The Kamoshika name was revived from March 1997 as a limited express service operating between Akita and Aomori, replacing the former Tazawa limited express service which ran between Morioka and Aomori via Akita before the Akita Shinkansen was opened.

From the start of the revised timetable on 4 December 2010, the Kamoshika services were discontinued, replaced by Tsugaru services, formerly operating between Hachinohe and Hirosaki, which were amended to operate between Aomori and Akita.

== See also ==
- List of named passenger trains of Japan
